= Vim Comedy Company =

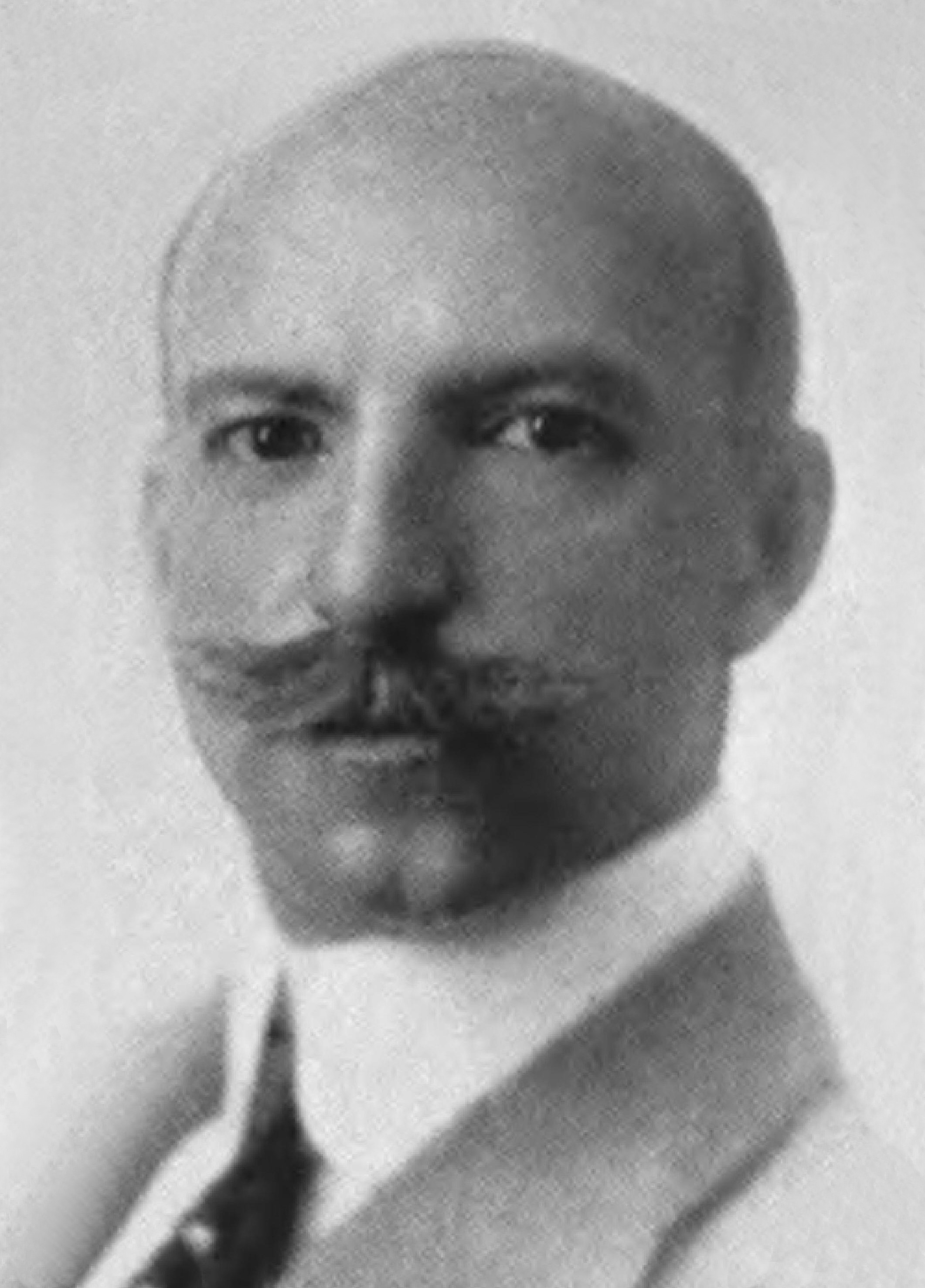
Mark Dintenfass

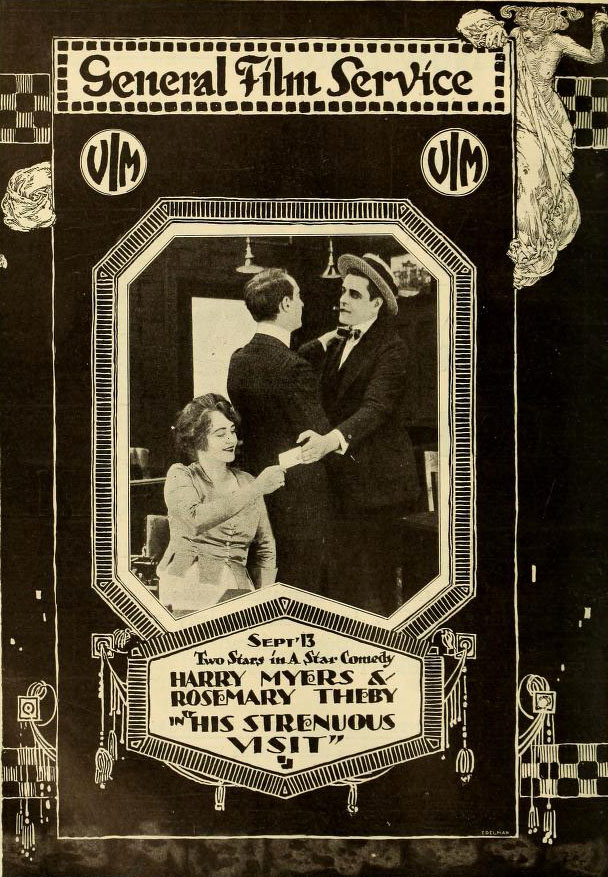
His Strenuous Visit (1916)

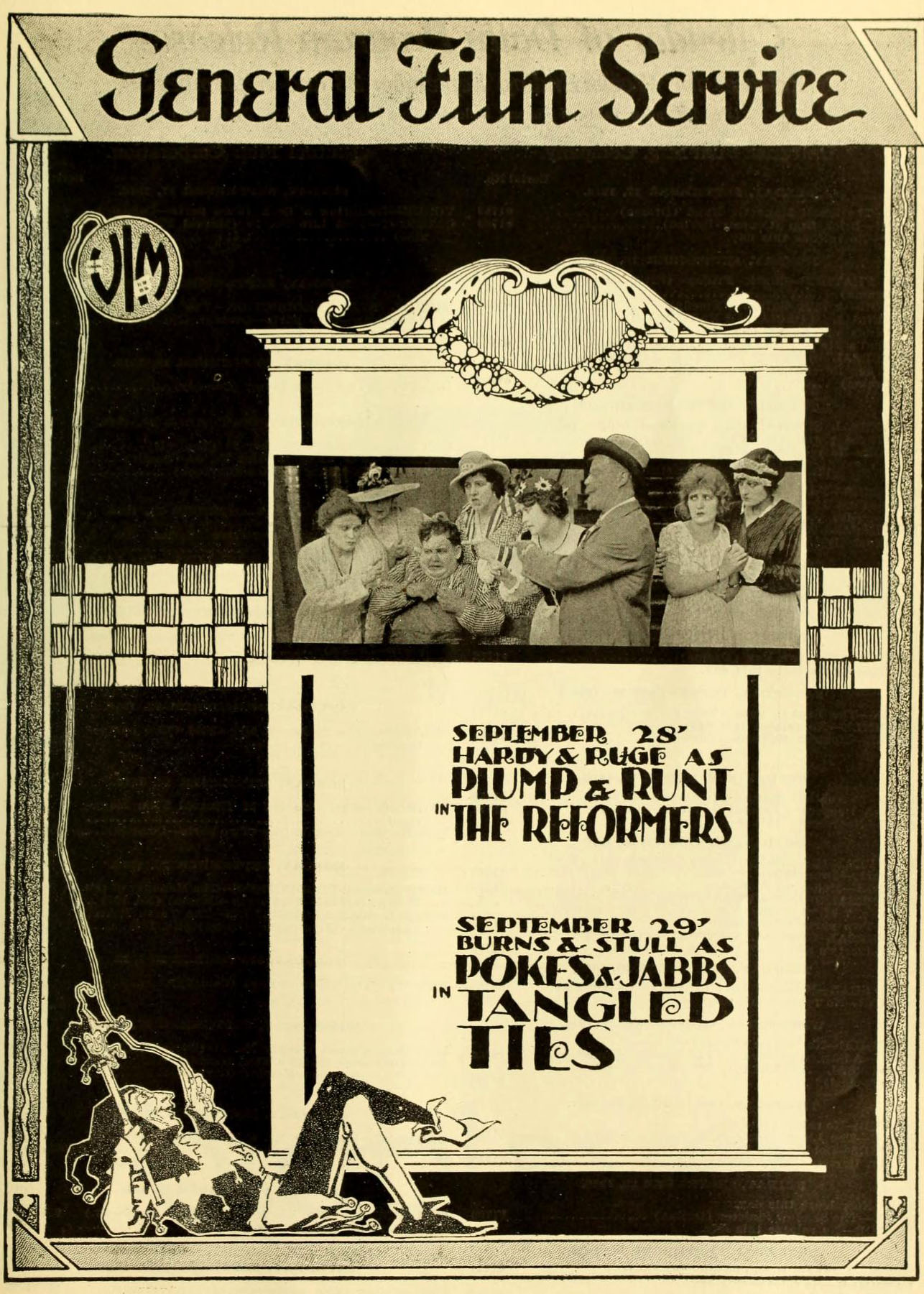
The Reformers (1916)

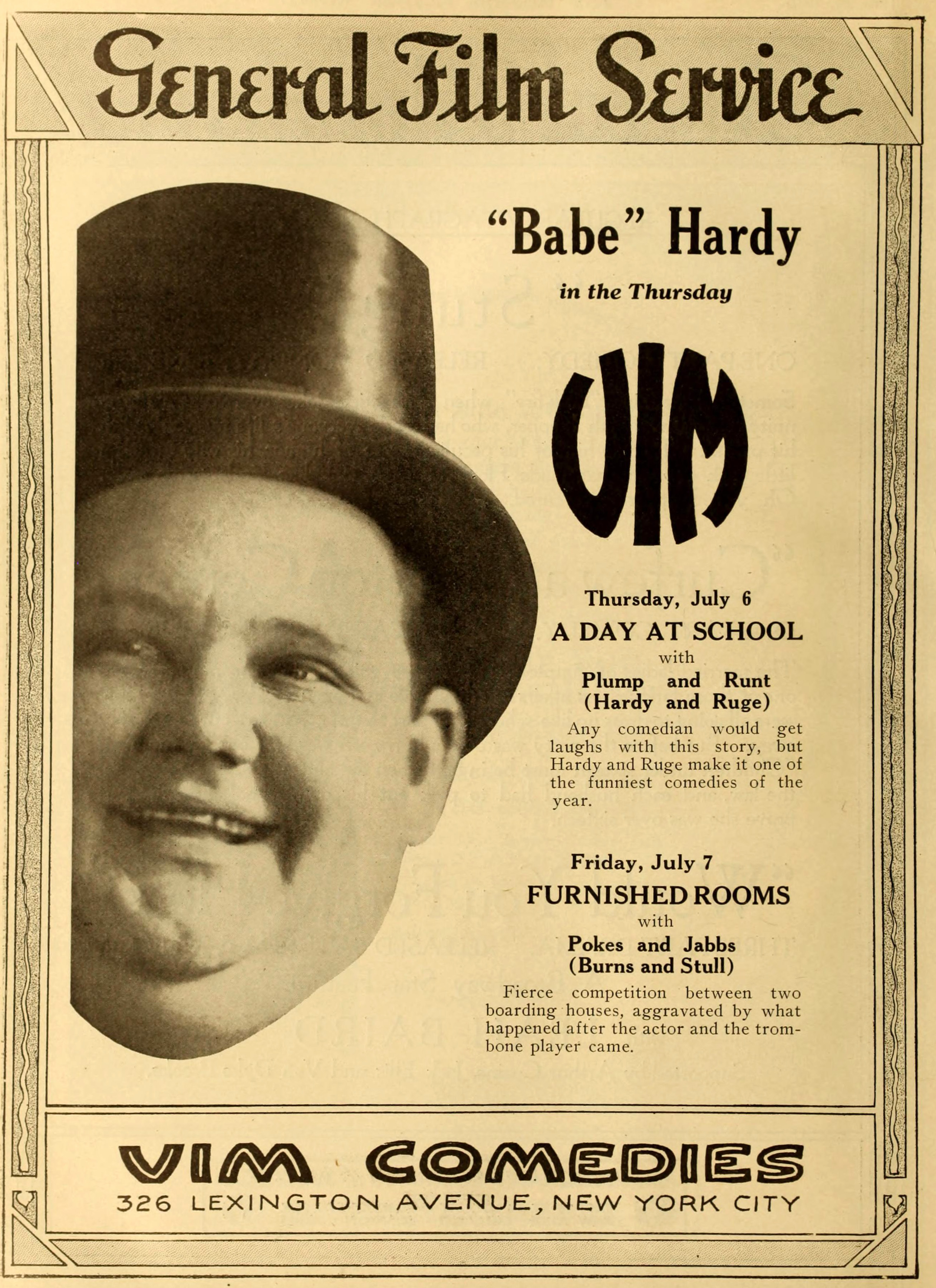
A Day at School (1916)

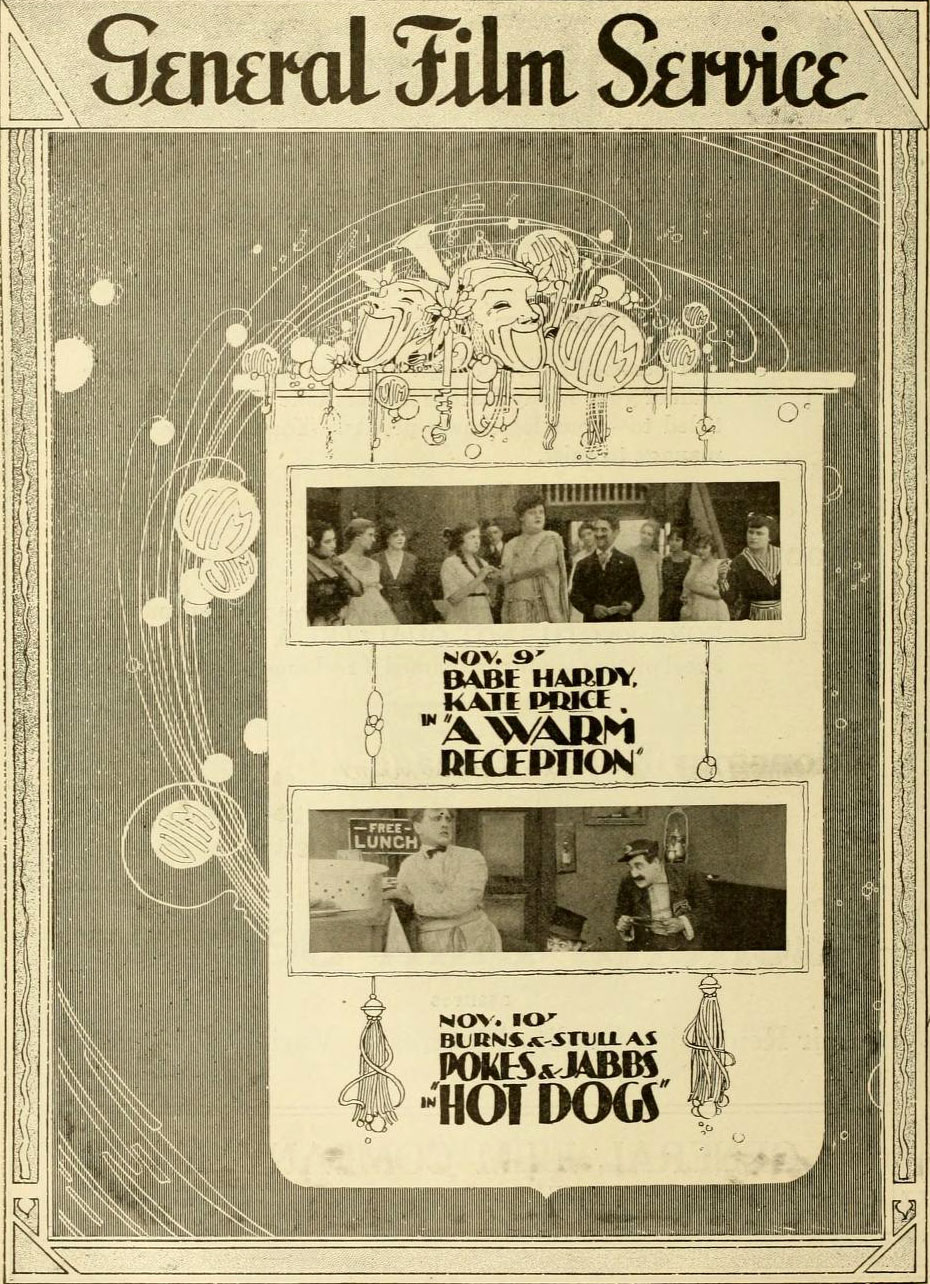
A Warm Reception (1916)

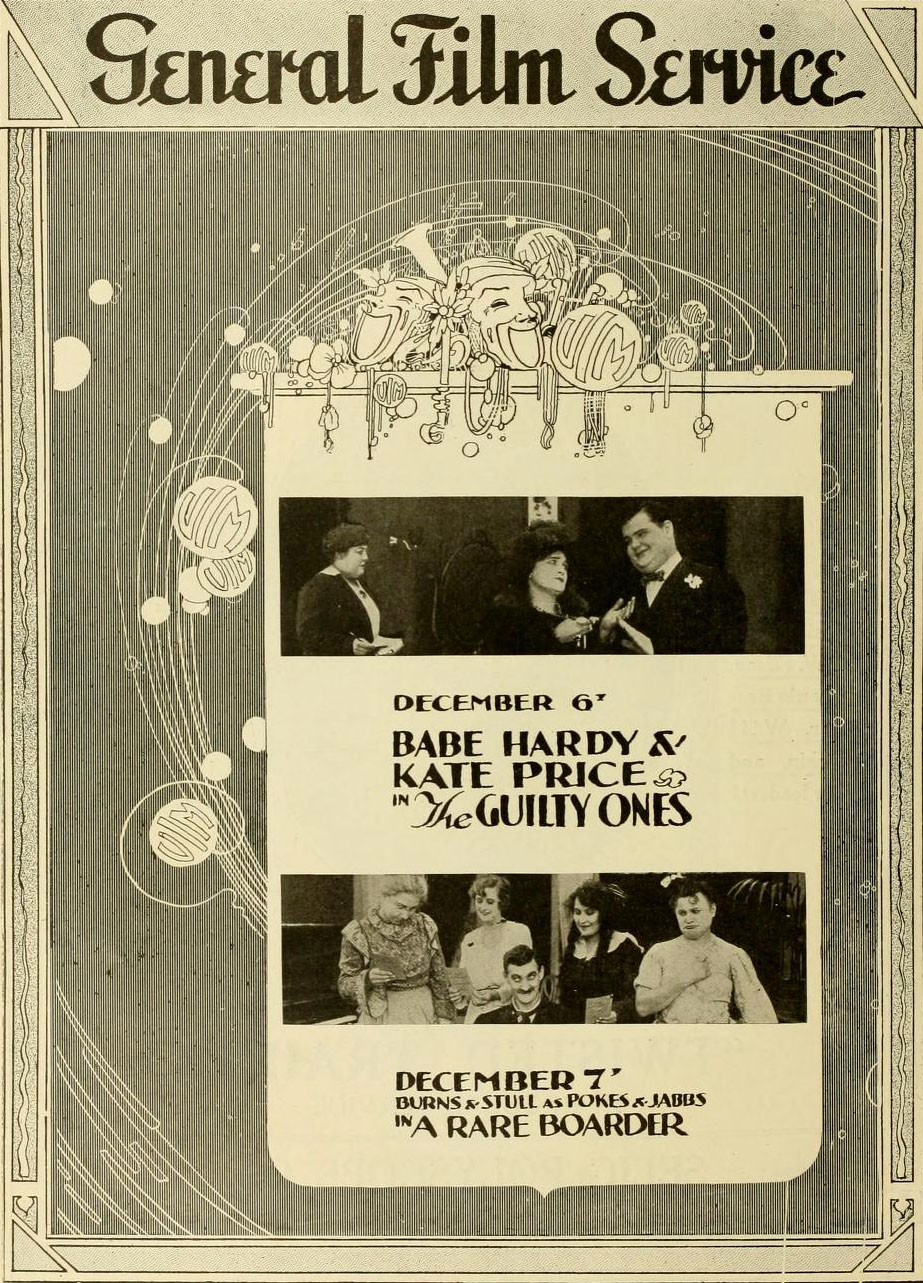
The Guilty Ones (1916)

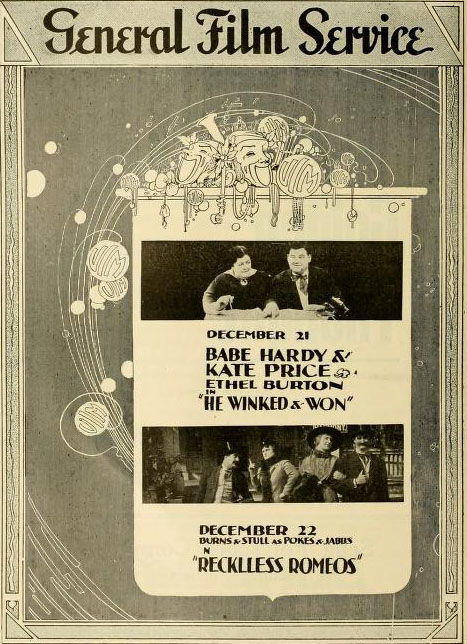
He Winked and Won (1916)

The Vim Comedy Company was a short-lived movie studio in Jacksonville, Florida and New York City. Vim bought out Siegmund Lubin's Lubin Manufacturing Company Jacksonville, Florida facilities at 750 Riverside Avenue in 1915 after that company went bankrupt. It was founded by Louis Burston and Mark Dintenfass. Vim specialized in two-reel comedies, producing hundreds of them in the short time it existed. Notable Vim actors were Oliver Hardy, Ethel Marie Burton, Walter Stull, Billy Ruge, Rosemary Theby, Billy Bletcher and his wife Arline Roberts, and Kate Price. At its peak Vim had a workforce of nearly 50 people. The Vim Comedy Company went out of business in 1917 after Oliver Hardy discovered that both Burstein and Dintenfass were stealing from the payroll. Vim was bought out by the King-Bee Films studio started by Burstein.

== Films ==
The following films were produced by the Vim Comedy Company:

Title	Release date	Series and starring actors
The Midnight Prowlers	November 1915	Pokes and Jabbs starring Walter Stull and Bobby Burns
A Pair of Birds	November 1915	Pokes and Jabbs starring Walter Stull and Bobby Burns
Pressing Business	November 1915	Pokes and Jabbs starring Walter Stull and Bobby Burns
Strangled Harmony	December 1915	Pokes and Jabbs starring Walter Stull and Bobby Burns
Speed Kings	December 1915	Pokes and Jabbs starring Walter Stull and Bobby Burns
Mixed and Fixed	December 1915	Pokes and Jabbs starring Walter Stull and Bobby Burns
Ups and Downs	December 1915	Pokes and Jabbs starring Walter Stull and Bobby Burns
This Way Out	January 1916	Pokes and Jabbs starring Walter Stull and Bobby Burns
Chickens	January 1916	Pokes and Jabbs starring Walter Stull and Bobby Burns
Frenzied Finance	January 1916	Pokes and Jabbs starring Walter Stull and Bobby Burns
Busted Hearts	January 1916	Pokes and Jabbs starring Walter Stull and Bobby Burns
The Getaway	February 1916	Pokes and Jabbs starring Walter Stull and Bobby Burns
The High Sign	February 1916	Pokes and Jabbs starring Walter Stull and Bobby Burns
Pluck and Luck	February 1916	Pokes and Jabbs starring Walter Stull and Bobby Burns
Love and Lather	February 1916	Pokes and Jabbs starring Walter Stull and Bobby Burns
A Pair of Skins	March 1916	Pokes and Jabbs starring Walter Stull and Bobby Burns
Behind the Footlights	March 1916	Pokes and Jabbs starring Walter Stull and Bobby Burns
Anvils and Actors	March 1916	Pokes and Jabbs starring Walter Stull and Bobby Burns
In the Ring	April 1916	Pokes and Jabbs starring Walter Stull and Bobby Burns
The Sleuths	April 1916	Pokes and Jabbs starring Walter Stull and Bobby Burns
Hired and Fired	April 1916	Pokes and Jabbs starring Walter Stull and Bobby Burns
Home Made Pies	May 1916	Pokes and Jabbs starring Walter Stull and Bobby Burns
The Pretenders	May 1916	Pokes and Jabbs starring Walter Stull and Bobby Burns
A Fair Exchange	May 1916	Pokes and Jabbs starring Walter Stull and Bobby Burns
Villains and Violins	June 1916	Pokes and Jabbs starring Walter Stull and Bobby Burns
The Land Lubers	June 1916	Pokes and Jabbs starring Walter Stull and Bobby Burns
A Dollar Down	June 1916	Pokes and Jabbs starring Walter Stull and Bobby Burns
Sea Dogs	June 1916	Pokes and Jabbs starring Walter Stull and Bobby Burns
Hungry Hearts	June 1916	Pokes and Jabbs starring Walter Stull and Bobby Burns
The Raid	June 1916	Pokes and Jabbs starring Walter Stull and Bobby Burns
For Better or Worse	June 1916	Pokes and Jabbs starring Walter Stull and Bobby Burns
For Value Received	June 1916	Pokes and Jabbs starring Walter Stull and Bobby Burns
Furnished Rooms	July 1916	Pokes and Jabbs starring Walter Stull and Bobby Burns
The Great Safe Tangle	July 1916	Pokes and Jabbs starring Walter Stull and Bobby Burns
Help! Help!	July 1916	Pokes and Jabbs starring Walter Stull and Bobby Burns
Wait a Minute	August 1916	Pokes and Jabbs starring Walter Stull and Bobby Burns
Rushing Business	August 1916	Pokes and Jabbs starring Walter Stull and Bobby Burns
Comrades	August 1916	Pokes and Jabbs starring Walter Stull and Bobby Burns
Dreamy Knights	August 1916	Pokes and Jabbs starring Walter Stull and Bobby Burns
The Try Out	August 1916	Pokes and Jabbs starring Walter Stull and Bobby Burns
Life Savers	August 1916	Pokes and Jabbs starring Walter Stull and Bobby Burns
A Bag of Troubles	September 1916	Pokes and Jabbs starring Walter Stull and Bobby Burns
Love and Duty	September 1916	Pokes and Jabbs starring Walter Stull and Bobby Burns
The Reward	September 1916	Pokes and Jabbs starring Walter Stull and Bobby Burns
Payment-in-Full	September 1916	Pokes and Jabbs starring Walter Stull and Bobby Burns
The Reformers	September 1916	Pokes and Jabbs starring Walter Stull and Bobby Burns
Strictly Business	October 1916	Pokes and Jabbs starring Walter Stull and Bobby Burns
The Frame-Up	October 1916	Pokes and Jabbs starring Walter Stull and Bobby Burns
Watch Your Watch	October 1916	Pokes and Jabbs starring Walter Stull and Bobby Burns
Here and There	October 1916	Pokes and Jabbs starring Walter Stull and Bobby Burns
In the Ranks	November 1916	Pokes and Jabbs starring Walter Stull and Bobby Burns
Hot Dogs	November 1916	Pokes and Jabbs starring Walter Stull and Bobby Burns
Good and Proper	November 1916	Pokes and Jabbs starring Walter Stull and Bobby Burns
Money-Maid Man	November 1916	Pokes and Jabbs starring Walter Stull and Bobby Burns
Ambitious Ethel	December 1916	Pokes and Jabbs starring Walter Stull and Bobby Burns
A Rare Boarder	December 1916	Pokes and Jabbs starring Walter Stull and Bobby Burns
What's the Use?	December 1916	Pokes and Jabbs starring Walter Stull and Bobby Burns
War Correspondents	January 1917	Pokes and Jabbs starring Walter Stull and Bobby Burns
A Special Delivery	January 1916	Plump and Runt starring Oliver Hardy and Billy Ruge
A Sticky Affair	February 1916	Plump and Runt starring Oliver Hardy and Billy Ruge
One Too Many	February 1916	Plump and Runt starring Oliver Hardy and Billy Ruge
The Serenade	March 1916	Plump and Runt starring Oliver Hardy and Billy Ruge
Nerve and Gasoline	March 1916	Plump and Runt starring Oliver Hardy and Billy Ruge
Their Vacation	March 1916	Plump and Runt starring Oliver Hardy and Billy Ruge
Momma's Boy	April 1916	Plump and Runt starring Oliver Hardy and Billy Ruge
A Royal Battle	April 1916	Plump and Runt starring Oliver Hardy and Billy Ruge
All for a Girl	April 1916	Plump and Runt starring Oliver Hardy and Billy Ruge
What's Sauce for the Goose	April 1916	Plump and Runt starring Oliver Hardy and Billy Ruge
The Brave Ones	May 1916	Plump and Runt starring Oliver Hardy and Billy Ruge
The Water Cure	May 1916	Plump and Runt starring Oliver Hardy and Billy Ruge
Thirty Days	May 1916	Plump and Runt starring Oliver Hardy and Billy Ruge
Baby Doll	May 1916	Plump and Runt starring Oliver Hardy and Billy Ruge
The Schemers	June 1916	Plump and Runt starring Oliver Hardy and Billy Ruge
Never Again	June 1916	Plump and Runt starring Oliver Hardy and Billy Ruge
Better Halves	June 1916	Plump and Runt starring Oliver Hardy and Billy Ruge
A Day at School	July 1916	Plump and Runt starring Oliver Hardy and Billy Ruge
Spaghetti	July 1916	Plump and Runt starring Oliver Hardy and Billy Ruge
Aunt Bill	July 1916	Plump and Runt starring Oliver Hardy and Billy Ruge
The Heroes	July 1916	Plump and Runt starring Oliver Hardy and Billy Ruge
Human Hounds	August 1916	Plump and Runt starring Oliver Hardy and Billy Ruge
Their Honeymoon	August 1916	Plump and Runt starring Oliver Hardy and Billy Ruge
An Aerial Joyride	August 1916	Plump and Runt starring Oliver Hardy and Billy Ruge
Sidetracked	September 1916	Plump and Runt starring Oliver Hardy and Billy Ruge
Stranded	September 1916	Plump and Runt starring Oliver Hardy and Billy Ruge
Royal Blood	October 1916	Plump and Runt starring Oliver Hardy and Billy Ruge
The Candy Trail	October 1916	Plump and Runt starring Oliver Hardy and Billy Ruge
The Precious Parcel	October 1916	Plump and Runt starring Oliver Hardy and Billy Ruge
Housekeeping	July 1916	Harry Myers and Rosemary Theby
Hubby's Relative	August 1916	Harry Myers and Rosemary Theby
That Tired Businessman	August 1916	Harry Myers and Rosemary Theby
Their Dream House	August 1916	Harry Myers and Rosemary Theby
The Tormented Husband	August 1916	Harry Myers and Rosemary Theby
The Chalk Line	September 1916	Harry Myers and Rosemary Theby
His Strenuous Visit	September 1916	Harry Myers and Rosemary Theby
Artistic Atmosphere	September 1916	Harry Myers and Rosemary Theby
A Grain of Suspicion	October 1916	Harry Myers and Rosemary Theby
Their Installment Furniture	October 1916	Harry Myers and Rosemary Theby
Green Eyes	October 1916	Harry Myers and Rosemary Theby
A Persistent Wooing	September 1916	Harry Myers and Rosemary Theby
Gertie's Garters	November 1916	Harry Myers and Rosemary Theby
Marked "No Fund"	November 1916	Harry Myers and Rosemary Theby
His Wedding Promise	November 1916	Harry Myers and Rosemary Theby
The Good Stenographer	November 1916	Harry Myers and Rosemary Theby
Hubby's Chicken	November 1916	Harry Myers and Rosemary Theby
Charity Begins and Home	December 1916	Harry Myers and Rosemary Theby
They Practice Economy	December 1916	Harry Myers and Rosemary Theby
Her Financial Frenzy	December 1916	Harry Myers and Rosemary Theby
That's All Wrong	January 1917	Harry Myers and Rosemary Theby
A Maid to Order	October 1916	Oliver Hardy and Kate Price
Twin Flats	November 1916	Oliver Hardy and Kate Price
A Warm Reception	November 1916	Oliver Hardy and Kate Price
Pipe Dreams	November 1916	Oliver Hardy and Kate Price
Mother's Child	November 1916	Oliver Hardy and Kate Price
The Prizewinners	November 1916	Oliver Hardy and Kate Price
The Guilty Ones	December 1916	Oliver Hardy and Kate Price
He Winked and Won	December 1916	Oliver Hardy and Kate Price
Fat and Fickle	December 1916	Oliver Hardy and Kate Price
The Love Bugs	January 1917	Oliver Hardy and Kate Price
The Boycotted Baby	January 1917	Oliver Hardy and Kate Price
The Other Girl	January 1917	Oliver Hardy and Kate Price
Bungles' Rainy Day	February 1916	Bungles starring Marcel Perez
Bungles Enforces the Law	February 1916	Bungles starring Marcel Perez
Bungles' Elopement	March 1916	Bungles starring Marcel Perez
Bungles Lands a Job	March 1916	Bungles starring Marcel Perez

== See also ==
- History of Jacksonville, Florida#Motion picture industry

== Bibliography ==
- Blair Miller (2013). Almost Hollywood: The Forgotten Story of Jacksonville, Florida. Rowman & Littlefield.
