= Oliver Hardy filmography =

Filmography

These are the films of Oliver Hardy as an actor without Stan Laurel. For the filmography of Laurel and Hardy as a team, see Laurel and Hardy filmography.

Oliver Norvell Hardy (born Norvell Hardy; January 18, 1892 – August 7, 1957) was an American comic actor and one half of Laurel and Hardy, the double act that began in the era of silent films and lasted from 1927 to 1957. He appeared with his comedy partner Stan Laurel in 107 short films, feature films, and cameo roles. He was credited with his first film, Outwitting Dad, in 1914. In most of his silent films before joining producer Hal Roach, he was billed on screen as "Babe Hardy."

== List ==
Billed as "Babe Hardy" unless otherwise noted

Year	Film	Role	Director	Notes
1914	Outwitting Dad	Reggie Kewp	Arthur Hotaling	Short; as O.N. Hardy
1914	Casey's Birthday	A Policeman		Short
1914	Building a Fire	Policeman		Short
1914	He Won a Ranch	A Cowboy	Arthur Hotaling	Short
1914	The Particular Cowboys	A Cowboy	Arthur Hotaling	Short
1914	For Two Pins	A Policeman	Arthur Hotaling	Short
1914	A Tango Tragedy	Person at Dance		Short
1914	A Brewerytown Romance	Cassidy, the cop	Frank Griffin	Short
1914	The Female Cop	Boob Cop	Jerold T. Hevener	Short
1914	Good Cider	Hiram	John A. Murphy	Short
1914	Long May It Wave	The King	John A. Murphy	Short
1914	Who's Boss?			Short
1914	His Sudden Recovery	Mr. Jones		Short
1914	The Kidnapped Bride	Daniel Cassidy	Frank Griffin	Short
1914	Worms Will Turn	A Policeman	Frank Griffin	Short
1914	The Rise of the Johnsons	The Grocery Man	John A. Murphy	Short; as Oliver Hardy
1914	He Wanted Work	The Foreman		Short
1914	They Bought a Boat	Cabin Boy		Short
1914	Back to the Farm	Tom	Will Louis, Joseph Levering	Short
1914	Making Auntie Welcome	Grocery Boy	Will Louis	Short
1914	The Green Alarm	Mike	Frank Griffin	Short; as O.N. Hardy
1914	Never Too Old	Phil	John A. Murphy	Short
1914	A Fool There Was	Traffic Cop	Frank Griffin	Short
1914	Pins Are Lucky	Peter Pelton	Frank Griffin	Short; as O.N. Hardy
1914	Jealous James	Grocery Boy		Short
1914	When the Ham Turned	Bartender	Frank Griffin	Short
1914	The Smuggler's Daughter	Gwendolyn's Father	Jerold T. Hevener	Short
1914	She Married for Love	An Onlooker		Short
1914	The Soubrette and the Simp	Fred, the Simp	Jerold T. Hevener	Short
1914	Kidnapping the Kid	Fattie	John A. Murphy	Short
1914	The Honor of the Force	Willie Gold	Frank Griffin	Short
1914	She Was the Other	Cutie - the Chief's 1st Sister	Arthur Hotaling	Short
1914	The Daddy of Them All	Peitzheimer		Short
1914	Mother's Baby Boy	Percival Pilkins		Short
1914	The Servant Girl's Legacy	Cy	Arthur Hotaling	Short
1914	He Wanted His Pants	A Cop		Short
1914	Dobs at the Shore	Meggie Heckla	Frank Griffin	Short
1914	The Fresh Air Cure	Morris Silverstein		Short
1914	Weary Willie's Rags	Hotel Clerk		Short
1915	What He Forgot		Jerold T. Hevener	Short
1915	They Looked Alike	Pedestrian	Frank Griffin	Short
1915	Spaghetti a la Mode		Will Louis	
1915	Gus and the Anarchists	Tom Dreck	John A. Murphy	Short
1915	Cupid's Target	Bob	Jerold T. Hevener	Short
1915	Shoddy the Tailor	Policeman	Willard Louis	Short
1915	The Prize Baby	Bill, the Prize Baby	Jerold T. Hevener	Short
1915	An Expensive Visit	Jack	Willard Louis	Short; as Oliver Hardy
1915	Cleaning Time	John Herringbone	Will Louis	Short
1915	Mixed Flats	Bob White	Willard Louis	Short; as Oliver Hardy
1915	Safety Worst	Bill Jone	Jerold T. Hevener	Short
1915	The Twin Sister	Bill Bolt - the Husband	Arthur Hotaling	Short; as Oliver Hardy
1915	Who Stole the Doggies?	Murphy, the Cop		Short; as Oliver Hardy
1915	Baby		Harry Myers	Short
1915	A Lucky Strike	Bill Myers	Arthur Hotaling	Short; as Oliver Hardy
1915	Matilda's Legacy	Fatty Waite	Arthur Hotaling	Short; as Oliver Hardy
1915	Capturing Bad Bill	Member of the posse		Short
1915	Her Choice		Albert G. Price	Short
1915	Cannibal King	Willie	Frank Griffin	Short
1915	It May Be You	Paul Simmons	Will Louis	Short; as O.N. Hardy
1915	What a Cinch	Police Chief Myers	Will Louis	Short
1915	Poor Baby	Matilda's Sweetheart	Will Louis	Short; as O.N. Hardy
1915	Not Much Force	City Councilman	Will Louis	Short; as O.N. Hardy
1915	Food for Kings and Riley		Will Louis	Short; as O.N. Hardy
1915	The Dead Letter	Mateo	Will Louis	Short; as Babe Hardy
1915	Clothes Make the Man	Rastus	Will Louis	Short; as O.N. Hardy
1915	The Haunted Hat		Will Louis	Short
1915	Avenging Bill	Bill, the Grocer's Boy	John A. Murphy	Short
1915	The Simp and the Sophomores	Professor Arm. Strong	Will Louis	Short; as O.N. Hardy
1915	Babe's School Days	Ikie Ikestein	Will Louis	Short
1915	The New Adventures of J. Rufus Wallingford		Theodore Wharton	Short
1915	Ethel's Romeos	Jake Stimpson	Edwin Middleton	Short
1915	Fatty's Fatal Fun	Fatty		Short
1915	The Crazy Clock Maker		Jerold T. Hevener	Short
1915	Something in Her Eye	The Grocer		Short
1915	The Midnight Prowlers		Walter Stull	Short
1915	Love, Pepper and Sweets	Fatty	Walter Stull	Short
1915	A Janitor's Joyful Job	Melinda Rousseau		Short
1915	Strangled Harmony		Walter Stull	Short
1915	Speed Kings		Walter Stull	Short
1915	Mixed and Fixed		Walter Stull	Short
1915	Ups and Downs	Shifty Mike	Walter Stull	Short
1916	Bouncing Baby			
1916	This Way Out	Plump	Walter Stull	Short
1916	Chickens		Walter Stull	Short
1916	Frenzied Finance		Walter Stull	Short
1916	A Special Delivery	Plump	Will Louis	Short
1916	Busted Hearts	Peggy Plump	Walter Stull	Short
1916	A Sticky Affair	Plump	Will Louis	Short
1916	Bungles' Rainy Day		Oliver Hardy	Short
1916	One Too Many	Plump	Will Louis	Short
1916	Bungles Enforces the Law		Oliver Hardy	Short
1916	The Serenade	Plump	Willard Louis	Short
1916	Bungles' Elopement		Oliver Hardy	Short
1916	Nerve and Gasoline	Plump	Will Louis	Short
1916	Bungles Lands a Job		Oliver Hardy	Short
1916	Their Vacation	Plump	Will Louis	Short
1916	Mamma's Boys	Plump	Will Louis	Short
1916	The Battle Royal	Plump	Will Louis	Short
1916	All for a Girl	Plump	Will Louis	Short
1916	Hired and Fired		Walter Stull	Short
1916	What's Sauce for the Goose	Mr. Boob Plump	Will Louis	Short
1916	The Brave Ones	Plump	Will Louis	Short
1916	The Water Cure	Plump	Will Louis	Short
1916	Thirty Days	Plump	Will Louis	Short
1916	Baby Doll	Plump	Will Louis	Short
1916	The Schemers	Plump	Will Louis	Short
1916	Sea Dogs	Plump	Will Louis	Short
1916	Hungry Hearts	Plump	Will Louis	Short
1916	Never Again	Plump	Willard Louis	Short
1916	The Lottery Man		Theodore Wharton	
1916	Better Halves	Plump	Will Louis	Short
1916	Edison Bugg's Invention	The Fire Chief	Jerold T. Hevener	Short
1916	A Day at School	Plump	Willard Louis	Short
1916	A Terrible Tragedy	Markoff	Jerold T. Hevener	Short
1916	Spaghetti	Plump	Will Louis	Short
1916	Aunt Bill	Plump	Will Louis	Short
1916	The Heroes	Plump	Will Louis	Short
1916	It Happened in Pikesville	Jiggs	Jerold T. Hevener	Short
1916	Human Hounds	Plump	Will Louis	Short
1916	Dreamy Knights	Plump	Will Louis	Short
1916	Life Savers	Plump	Will Louis	Short
1916	Their Honeymoon	Plump	Will Louis	Short
1916	The Try Out		Walter Stull	Short
1916	An Aerial Joyride	Plump	Will Louis	Short; as Oliver Hardy
1916	Sidetracked	Plump	Will Louis	Short
1916	Stranded	Plump	Will Louis	Short
1916	Love and Duty	Pvt. Plump	Will Louis	Short
1916	The Reformers	Plump	Will Louis	Short
1916	Royal Blood	Plump	Will Louis	Short
1916	The Candy Trail	Plump	Will Louis	Short
1916	The Precious Parcel	Plump	Willard Louis	Short
1916	A Maid to Order	Plump	Will Louis	Short
1916	Twin Flats	Babe		Short
1916	A Warm Reception	Babe		Short
1916	Pipe Dreams	Babe	Will Louis	Short
1916	Mother's Child	Babe	Will Louis	Short
1916	Prize Winners	Babe		Short
1916	Ambitious Ethel			Short
1916	The Guilty Ones	Babe	Oliver Hardy	Short
1916	He Winked and Won	Babe	Oliver Hardy	Short
1916	He Went and Won			Short
1916	Fat and Fickle	Babe	Oliver Hardy	Short
1917	The Prospectors			Short
1917	The Boycotted Baby	Babe	Oliver Hardy	Short
1917	The Love Bugs	Babe		Short
1917	The Modiste			Short
1917	Little Nell			Short
1917	The Other Girl	Babe	Oliver Hardy	Short
1917	A Mix Up In Hearts		Oliver Hardy	Short
1917	Wanted as A Bad Man			Short
1917	Back Stage		Arvid E. Gillstrom	Short
1917	The Hero	Count Bon Ami - The Hero's Rival	Arvid E. Gillstrom	Short
1917	Dough Nuts	Babe, the chef	Arvid E. Gillstrom	Short
1917	Cupid's Rival	Poor Artist	Billy West	Short
1917	The Villain	Babe	Arvid E. Gillstrom	Short
1917	The Millionaire	The mother-in-law	Arvid E. Gillstrom	Short
1917	The Goat	His Neighbor	Arvid E. Gillstrom	Short
1917	The Fly Cop	Proprietor	Arvid E. Gillstrom	Short
1917	The Chief Cook	Babe	Arvid E. Gillstrom	Short
1917	The Candy Kid		Arvid E. Gillstrom	Short
1917	The Hobo	Harold	Arvid E. Gillstrom	Short
1917	The Pest		Arvid E. Gillstrom	Short
1917	The Band Master		Arvid E. Gillstrom	Short
1917	The Slave	The Sultan of Bacteria	Arvid E. Gillstrom	Short; as Oliver Hardy
1918	The Stranger	Oliver, the saloonkeeper	Arvid E. Gillstrom	Short; as Oliver Hardy
1918	His Day Out	Ollie	Arvid E. Gillstrom	Short; as Oliver Hardy
1918	The Rogue	Cafe Owner	Arvid E. Gillstrom	Short
1918	The Orderly		Arvid E. Gillstrom	Short
1918	The Scholar		Arvid E. Gillstrom	Short
1918	The Messenger		Arvid E. Gillstrom	Short
1918	The Handy Man		Charley Chase	Short
1918	Bright and Early	The Boss	Charley Chase	Short
1918	The Straight and Narrow	His former cellmate	Charley Chase	Short
1918	Playmates	Kid	Charley Chase	Short
1918	Beauties in Distress		Charley Chase	Short
1918	Business Before Honesty	The Blind Man	Charley Chase	Short
1918	Hello Trouble	A devoted husband	Charley Chase	Short
1918	Painless Love	Dr. Hurts	Charley Chase	Short
1918	The King of the Kitchen	A German customer	Frank Griffin	Short
1918	He's in Again	Head Waiter	Charley Chase	Short
1919	The Freckled Fish	Solomon Soopmeat	Joseph Le Brandt	Short
1919	Hop, the Bellhop	Solomon Soop	Charles Parrott	Short
1919	Soapsuds and Sapheads	Foreman	[1]	Short
1919	Lions and Ladies		Frank Griffin	Short
1919	Hearts in Hock		Charley Chase	Short
1919	Jazz and Jailbirds	I.M. Ruff	J. A. Howe	Short
1919	Mules and Mortgages	Strongarm	J. A. Howe	Short
1919	Tootsies and Tamales	The Murderous Mexican	Noel M. Smith	Short
1919	Healthy and Happy	Doctor	Noel M. Smith	Short
1919	Flips and Flops	Mr. Jipper	Gilbert Pratt	Short
1919	Yaps and Yokels	The Hired Hand	Noel M. Smith	Short
1919	Mates and Models	A Nutty Artist	Noel M. Smith	Short
1919	Dull Care	A Janitor	Larry Semon	Short
1919	Squabs and Squabbles	The Boss	Noel M. Smith	Short
1919	Bungs and Bunglers	Al K. Hall	Noel M. Smith	Short
1919	The Head Waiter	A Cop	Larry Semon	Short
1919	Switches and Sweeties		Noel M. Smith	Short
1920	Dames and Dentists		Noel M. Smith	Short
1920	Maids and Muslin	Mr. Yards	Noel M. Smith	Short
1920	Squeaks and Squawks	The Landlord	Noel M. Smith	Short
1920	Fists and Fodder	Her Father	Jess Robbins	Short
1920	Distilled Love	Mr. Peeble Ford	Richard Smith	Short
1920	Pals and Pugs	A Bully	Jess Robbins	Short
1920	He Laughs Last	Handsome Ha	Jess Robbins	Short
1920	Springtime	The Commissioner	Jess Robbins	Short
1920	The Decorator	Babe, a millionaire	Jess Robbins	Short
1920	The Stage Hand	Audience member (uncredited)	Norman Taurog	Short; uncredited
1920	Married to Order	Her Father	Charley Chase	Short
1920	The Trouble Hunter	The Bouncer	Jess Robbins	Short
1920	His Jonah Day	The Life Saver	Jess Robbins	Short
1920	The Backyard	The ruffian	Jess Robbins	Short
1920	The Mysterious Stranger	Toreador	Jess Robbins	Short
1921	The Nuisance	The Walrus	Jess Robbins	Short
1921	The Blizzard	Janitor	Jess Robbins	Short
1921	The Bakery	Foreman	Norman Taurog	Short
1921	The Rent Collector	The Big Boss	Norman Taurog	Short
1921	The Tourist	Leader of the outlaws	Jess Robbins	Short
1921	The Fall Guy	Gentleman Joe, alias Black Bart	Norman Taurog	Short
1921	The Bell Hop	Hotel manager	Norman Taurog	Short
1922	The Sawmill	The foreman	Norman Taurog	Short
1922	The Show	Stage manager / Audience Member	Norman Taurog	Short
1922	A Pair of Kings	General Alarm	Norman Taurog	Short
1922	Golf	The neighbor	Larry Semon	Short
1922	Fortune's Mask		Robert Ensminger	
1922	Little Wildcat		David Smith	
1922	The Agent	Don Fusiloil	Larry Semon	Short
1922	The Counter Jumper	Gaston Gilligan	Larry Semon	Short
1923	No Wedding Bells	The Girl's Father	Larry Semon	Short
1923	The Barnyard	Farm Hand	Larry Semon	Short
1923	The Midnight Cabaret	Oliver, an Impetuous Suitor	Larry Semon	Short
1923	The Gown Shop	Store manager	Larry Semon	Short
1923	Lightning Love	Oliver, the Other Suitor	Larry Semon	Short
1923	Horseshoes	Dynamite Duffy	Larry Semon	Short
1924	Trouble Brewing	Bootlegger	Larry Semon	Short
1924	The Girl in the Limousine		Noel M. Smith	
1924	Her Boy Friend	Killer Kid	Noel M. Smith	Short; as Oliver N. Hardy
1924	Kid Speed	Dangerous Dan McGraw	Noel M. Smith	Short; as Oliver N. Hardy
1925	Stick Around	Paperhanger	Ward Hayes	Short
1925	Hey, Taxi!	A Rival Taxi Driver	Ted Burnsten	Short
1925	The Wizard of Oz		Larry Semon	
1925	Rivals	The Rival	Ward Hayes	Short; as Oliver Hardy
1925	Wild Papa	The Model's Brother	J.A. Howe	Short
1925	Fiddlin' Around	Theatre manager		Short; as Oliver Hardy
1925	Isn't Life Terrible?	Remington - the Brother-in-Law	Leo McCarey	Short
1925	Hop to It!	A bellhop	Ted Burnsten	Short
1925	The Joke's on You	Wilbert Perkins	Ralph Ceder	Short; as Oliver Hardy
1925	Yes, Yes, Nanette	Nanette's Former Sweetheart	Stan Laurel; Clarence Hennecke	Short
1925	They All Fall	The boss	Ralph Ceder	Short
1925	Should Sailors Marry?	Doctor	Jess Robbins	Short; as Oliver Hardy
1925	Laughing Ladies	Policeman		Short; as Oliver Hardy
1925	The Perfect Clown		Fred C. Newmeyer	
1926	Stop, Look and Listen		Larry Semon	
1926	A Bankrupt Honeymoon	The Taxi Driver	Lewis Seiler	Short
1926	Wandering Papas	Camp Foreman	Stan Laurel	Short
1926	Madame Mystery	Captain Schmaltz	Stan Laurel	Short; as Oliver Hardy
1926	Say It with Babies	Hector - the Floorwalker	Fred Guiol	Short
1926	Long Fliv the King	The Prime Minister's Assistant	Leo McCarey	Short; as Oliver Hardy
1926	The Cow's Kimona		James Parrott	Scenes deleted
1926	The Gentle Cyclone	Sheriff Bill	W. S. Van Dyke	Lost film
1926	Thundering Fleas	Officer	Robert F. McGowan	Short
1926	Along Came Auntie	Mr. Vincent Belcher - the First Husband	Richard Wallace	Short; as Oliver Hardy
1926	Crazy like a Fox	Charley's Victim (uncredited)	Leo McCarey	Short; uncredited
1926	Bromo and Juliet	Cab Driver	Leo McCarey	Short; as Oliver Hardy
1926	Be Your Age	Oswald Schwartzkopple	Leo McCarey	Short
1926	The Nickel-Hopper	Jazz Band Drummer (uncredited)	Hal Yates	Short; uncredited
1927	Two-Time Mama	The Cop	Fred Guiol	Short
1927	Should Men Walk Home?	Party Guest at Punch Bowl	Leo McCarey	Short; as Oliver Hardy
1927	Why Girls Say No	Policeman	Leo McCarey	Short; as Oliver Hardy; uncredited
1927	The Honorable Mr. Buggs		Fred Jackman	
1927	No Man's Law		Fred Jackman	
1927	Crazy to Act	Gordon Bagley	Earle Rodney	Short; as Oliver Hardy
1927	Fluttering Hearts	Big Bill	James Parrott	Short; as Oliver Hardy
1927	Baby Brother	Ice Man	Anthony Mack/Charles Oelze	Short
1927	Love 'Em and Feed 'Em	'Happy' Hopey	Clyde Bruckman	Short; as Oliver Hardy
1928	Galloping Ghosts	Meadows/Officer 13	James Parrott	Short; as Oliver Hardy
1928	Barnum & Ringling, Inc.	Startled drunk	Robert F. McGowan	Short
1939	Zenobia	Dr. Tibbett	Gordon Douglas	
1949	The Fighting Kentuckian	Willie Paine	George Waggner	
1950	Riding High	Gambler at Racetrack (uncredited)	Frank Capra	

Unconfirmed film appearances

- The Artist's Model (1916)
- Terrible Kate (1917)
- His Movie Mustache (1917)
- Bad Kate (1917)
- This Is Not My Room (1917)
- Pipe Dreams and Prizes (1920)
- The Perfect Lady (1924)
- Roaring Lions at Home (1924)
- Laughing Ladies (1925)
