= All for a Girl =

All for a Girl may refer to:

- All for a Girl (1912 film), a 1912 American short silent film romantic comedy
- All for a Girl (1915 film), a 1915 American comedy drama short silent film
- All for a Girl (1916 film), a 1916 American silent comedy film
