= Spaghetti (disambiguation) =

Spaghetti is a long thin form of pasta.

Spaghetti or spaghetto may also refer to:

== Film ==
- Spaghetti (film), a 1916 film starring Oliver Hardy
- Spaghetti Western, a genre of films produced by Italian production companies in the 1960s

== Music ==
- Spaghetti Records, a record label
- "Spaghetti" (song), by Le Sserafim, 2025
- "Spaghetti", a song by Fat Joe and Remy Ma from Plata O Plomo
- "Spaghettii", a song by Beyoncé from Cowboy Carter

== People ==
- Diana Manfredi, nicknamed "Spaghetto"
- Tony "Spaghetti" Eustace (1948–1985), Australian fugitive who was found murdered in 1985

== Other uses ==
- Spaghetti code, in software
- Spaghetti plot, a method of showing possible flows through systems
- Spaghetti sort, a sorting algorithm
- Spaghetti squash, a fruit
- Spaghetti straps, a type of clothing strap

== See also ==
- Spaghetti tree, a 1957 BBC April Fools' Day hoax
- Flying Spaghetti Monster, a religion (or pseudoreligion)
- Spaghetti Junction, one of several highway junctions, nicknamed due to their complexity
- Spaghettification, a phenomenom in astrophysics
- "The Spaghetti Incident?", a cover album by Guns N' Roses
- The Spaghetti Family, an animated television series
- Spaghett, a cocktail made with Miller High Life, Aperol, and lemon juice
