= The Haunted Hat =

1915 film

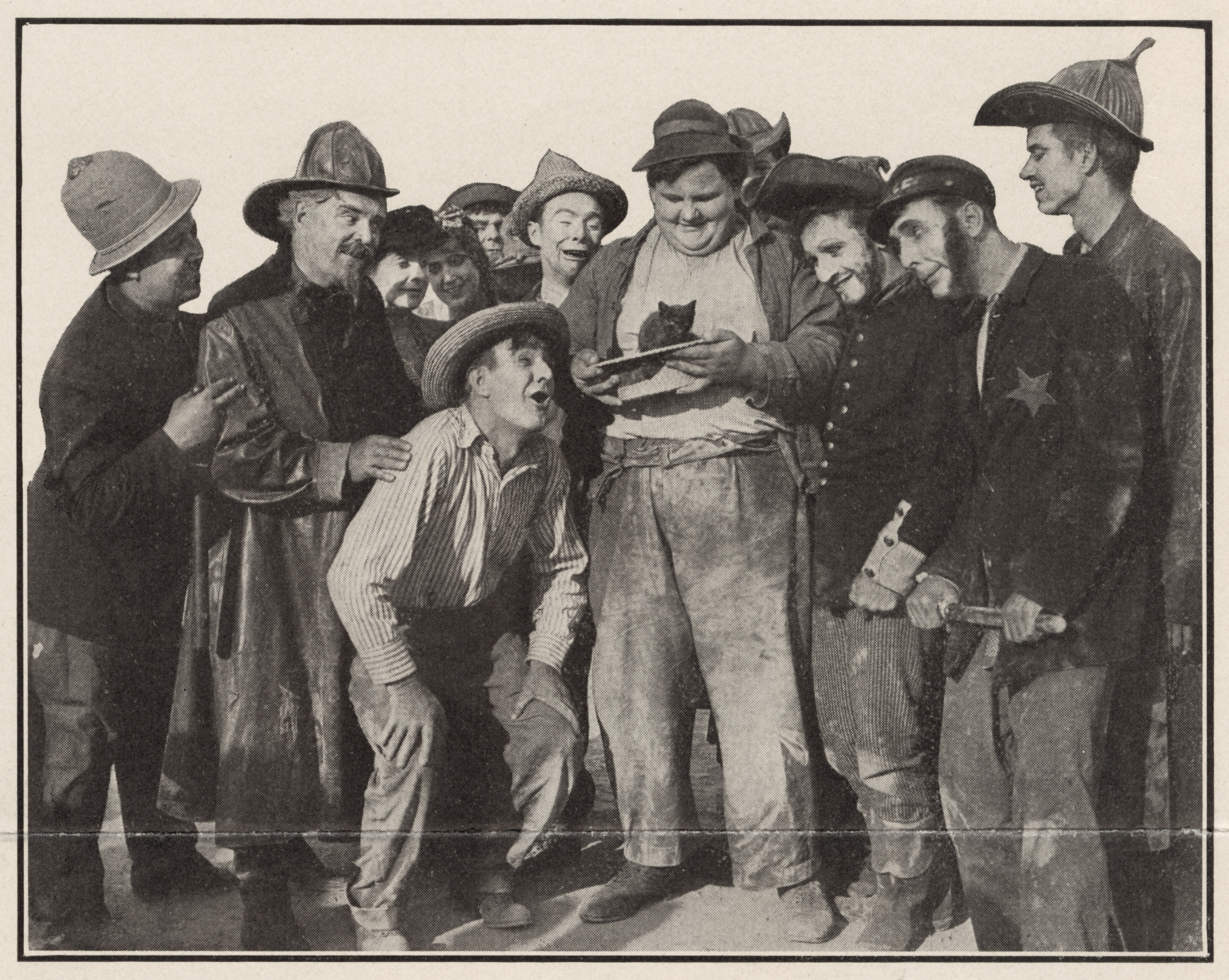
- Babe Hardy and the cast in a publicity still for The Haunted Hat
- Directed by: Will Louis
- Written by: Arthur Hotaling
- Produced by: Arthur Hotaling
- Starring: Will Louis
- Release date: August 31, 1915
- Country: United States
- Languages: Silent film English intertitles

The Haunted Hat is a 1915 American silent comedy film featuring Oliver Hardy. It was on a split reel with Avenging Bill.

== Plot ==
This plot summary was printed in The Moving Picture World for August 28, 1915:

[A little black cat] gets under the boss's discarded straw hat, and, being unable to extricate itself, goes on a jaunt, hat and all. The simple town folk had never before seen an auto-hat and seeing this one travel about think it is a [ghost]. Finally the whole town is up in arms, police and fire departments included ; they capture the hat after many hairbreadth escapes and rescue the little black cat. [Note that this description originally used a word that can be perceived as a racist pun, so I put ghost in brackets. The opening words are also in brackets. The original wording is viewable at the link.]

== Cast ==
- Will Louis as The Boss (?probably Willard Louis)
- Oliver Hardy (as Babe Hardy)

== See also ==
- List of American films of 1915
- Oliver Hardy filmography
