= Mamma's Boys =

1916 film

- Directed by: Will Louis
- Produced by: Louis Burstein
- Starring: Oliver Hardy
- Release date: April 6, 1916
- Country: United States
- Languages: Silent film English intertitles

Mamma's Boys, also known as Mamma's Boy, is a 1916 American silent comedy film featuring Oliver Hardy.

== Plot ==
This summary comes from The Moving Picture World of April 8, 1916:

'Way back in the woods, Plump and Runt, the apples of their mother's eye, work on the farm. Unfortunately, their pranks get them into trouble with the neighbors and as mother takes in summer boarders, the boys are always in hot water. One of the guests, an old grouchy dyspeptic, is the object of their attention. The arrival of a golfing enthusiast diverts their ideas into new channels and they forthwith steal his clubs and proceed to play the "ancient and noble game." The fact that the balls are missing does not in any way prevent our heroes from becoming champions for they use all the available eggs they can find.

Their first shot flies far and true, finding a billet in old grouch's face. The second hits their distracted mother as she is doing the family wash, while the third puts to flight a jovial party of picnickers. Tried beyond all patience and hoping that the change will improve them, mother arranges for them to visit her brother, a captain of police, and they depart for new lands to conquer.

In the city, they make a slight mistake in the directions given to them and enter a strange house, where they find a nice dinner awaiting. Putting an end to this, they feel tired and enter a bedroom and go to sleep. They are rudely awakened by the owner's entrance, who promptly empties his gun and chases Plump out in the streets. Runt, from under the bed, crawls into the place vacated by his pal and again goes to dreamland, only to be aroused out by the horrified screams of the wife. Up and down the street they are chased, finally captured and haled to court where they discover the presiding officer to be their much sought relative, and the old boy, listening to their story, promises that he, at least, will give a good time to mamma's boys.

== Cast ==
- Oliver Hardy as Plump (as Babe Hardy)
- Billy Ruge as Runt
- Bert Tracy

== See also ==
- List of American films of 1916
- Oliver Hardy filmography
