= Clothes Make the Man =

1915 film

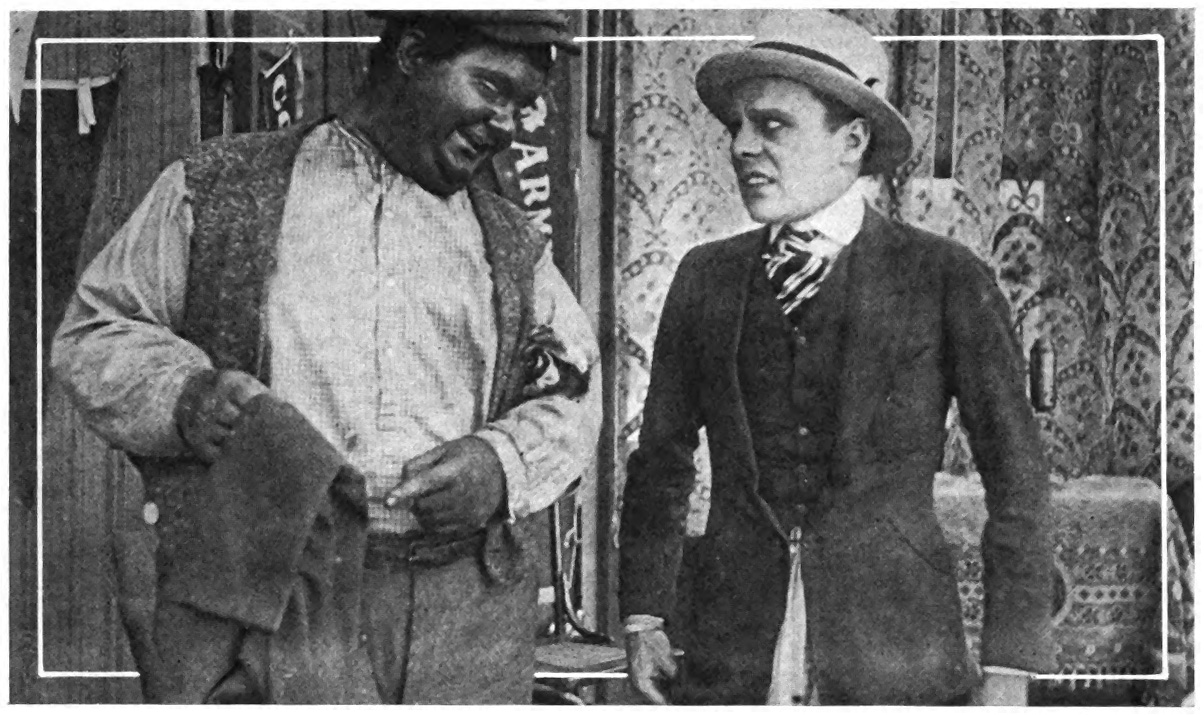
- Promotional still from Clothes Make the Man featuring Raymond McKee (right) and Oliver Hardy (left)
- Directed by: Will Louis
- Written by: Edwin R. Coffin
- Starring: Raymond McKee
- Release date: August 25, 1915
- Country: United States
- Languages: Silent film English intertitles

Clothes Make the Man is a 1915 American film featuring Oliver Hardy.

== Cast ==
- Raymond McKee as Harold
- Yale Benner as Kearney
- Jean Dumar as Ethel
- Oliver Hardy as Rastus (as O.N. Hardy)
- Guido Colucci as George
- Maxine Brown as Sarah
- James Harris as Mr. Clancey
- Alice Grey as Phoebe Snow

== See also ==
- List of American films of 1915
- Oliver Hardy filmography
