= The Rise of the Johnsons =

1914 film

- Directed by: John A. Murphy
- Written by: John A. Murphy
- Produced by: Arthur Hotaling
- Starring: John Edwards; Mattie Edwards
- Release date: August 1, 1914
- Running time: 6–7 minutes (c. 600 feet)
- Country: United States
- Languages: Silent film English intertitles

The Rise of the Johnsons is a lost 1914 American silent comedy film produced by the Lubin Manufacturing Company, featuring John Edwards, Mattie Edwards, and Oliver Hardy.

== Plot ==
Steve Johnson and his wife are down on their luck. Steve borrows some money from the grocery man, but rather than buying groceries, he is persuaded to join a game of craps on the upper floor of a nearby house. When the game attracts the attention of the police, the gamblers try to escape by sliding down a chute from an upstairs window, only to find that the cops have parked a paddy wagon at the bottom of the chute. While the others slide down into the wagon, Steve gathers up the money and escapes by another window. The next day he pays off his bills and returns home to a lavish banquet, accompanied by two new servants.

== Cast ==
- John Edwards as Steve Johnson
- Mattie Edwards as Mrs. Johnson
- Oliver Hardy as the Grocery Man (billed as Babe Hardy)

== Production and reception ==
The Rise of the Johnsons was filmed in Jacksonville, Florida, at the Jacksonville unit of the Lubin Manufacturing Company, under the general supervision of Arthur Hotaling. It was a short split-reel comedy, lasting approximately 6–7 minutes, and sharing a single reel of film with a second, unrelated comedy, She Gave Him a Rose, starring Raymond McKee, Frances Ne Moyer, and William Rice. The films were released by the General Film Company on August 1, 1914.

The Rise of the Johnsons was one of a series of "Colored Comedies" produced by the Lubin studio between 1913 and 1915, starring veteran vaudeville and minstrel show performers John (Junk) Edwards and Mattie Edwards. Apart from the two stars, most of the casts of these films were untrained Black extras from the Jacksonville community, but a few parts were played by white members of the Florida stock company, including, in this case, the young Oliver Hardy, who had a small role as a grocery man.

Reviews of the film in the trade papers were positive, although sometimes condescending and emphasizing the film's appeal as a glimpse of stereotypical African American life. Motion Picture News praised the Edwards as "those inimitable darkey comedians"; and The Bioscope described the comedy as "a briskly played tale of the American 'darkey' life, ... a welcome novelty and sufficiently good to create many laughs at the antics of the artists. Much talent is displayed in the acting, and although the acquisition of Massa Johnson's wealth may be seen as a somewhat doubtful proceeding, a highly humorous burlesque is the result." Moving Picture World wrote "John and Mattie Edwards and Babe Hardy have the leading roles and make of this a laughable and entertaining comedy. The incidents which occur in the various scenes kept the audience laughing heartily."

== See also ==
- List of American films of 1914
- Oliver Hardy filmography
