= The Battle Royal =

1916 film

- Full film
- Directed by: Will Louis
- Produced by: Louis Burstein
- Starring: Oliver Hardy
- Release date: April 13, 1916
- Country: United States
- Languages: Silent film English intertitles

The Battle Royal is a 1916 American silent comedy film featuring Oliver Hardy teamed here with Billy Ruge in the "Plump and Runt" Vim Studios comedy series.

== Plot ==
In the hills of Kentucky, the Plumps and the Runts are neighbors and bootleggers. Peter Plump (Oliver "Babe" Hardy) is in love with one of the Runts, and her brother (Billy Ruge) is in love with one of the Plumps. Peter and his future brother-in-law go fishing and hook the same fish which starts a fight over whose it is. The fracas escalates, and soon the two families are shooting at each other. Then government revenue agents arrive and both families join together to run off the common enemy.

== Cast ==
- Oliver Hardy as Plump (as Babe Hardy)
- Billy Ruge as Runt
- Elsie MacLeod as Runt's sister
- Billy Bletcher as Grandpa Runt
- Will Louis as Revenue Officer

== Theatrical release ==
Vim Comedies 1-reel (approx 13 minutes) Silent / B&W

== Home Video ==
- 1951 - Castle Films sold on 16mm and Standard 8mm film
- 2007 - Looser Than Loose Publishing on DVD
- 2018 - Alpha Video Distributors on the "Early Silent basics" DVD.

== See also ==
- List of American films of 1916
- Oliver Hardy filmography
