= Babe's School Days =

1915 film

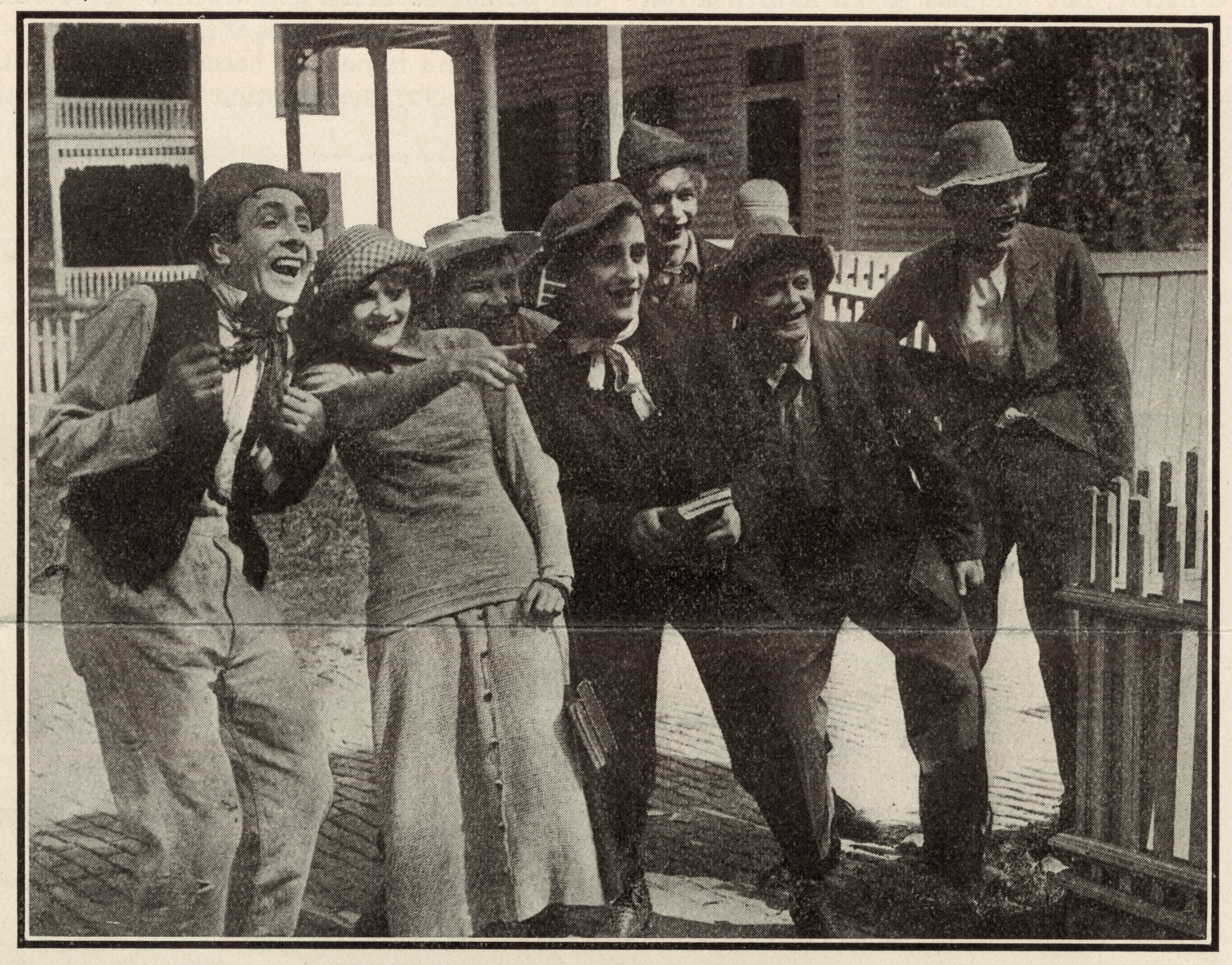
- The crowd makes fun of Babe in a publicity still from Babe's School Days
- Directed by: Will Louis
- Written by: Will Louis
- Produced by: Arthur Hotaling
- Starring: Oliver Hardy
- Release date: September 14, 1915
- Country: United States
- Languages: Silent film English intertitles

Babe's School Days is a 1915 American silent comedy film featuring Oliver Hardy, made in Jacksonville, Florida, by the Lubin Film Company.

== Plot ==
Ikie is bullied and mocked at school, so his father comes along to protect him, and gets in fights with the other schoolboys.

== Cast ==
- Oliver Hardy as Ikie Ikestein (as Babe Hardy)
- James Levering as Levi Ikestein

== See also ==
- List of American films of 1915
- Oliver Hardy filmography
