= Mother's Baby Boy =

1914 film

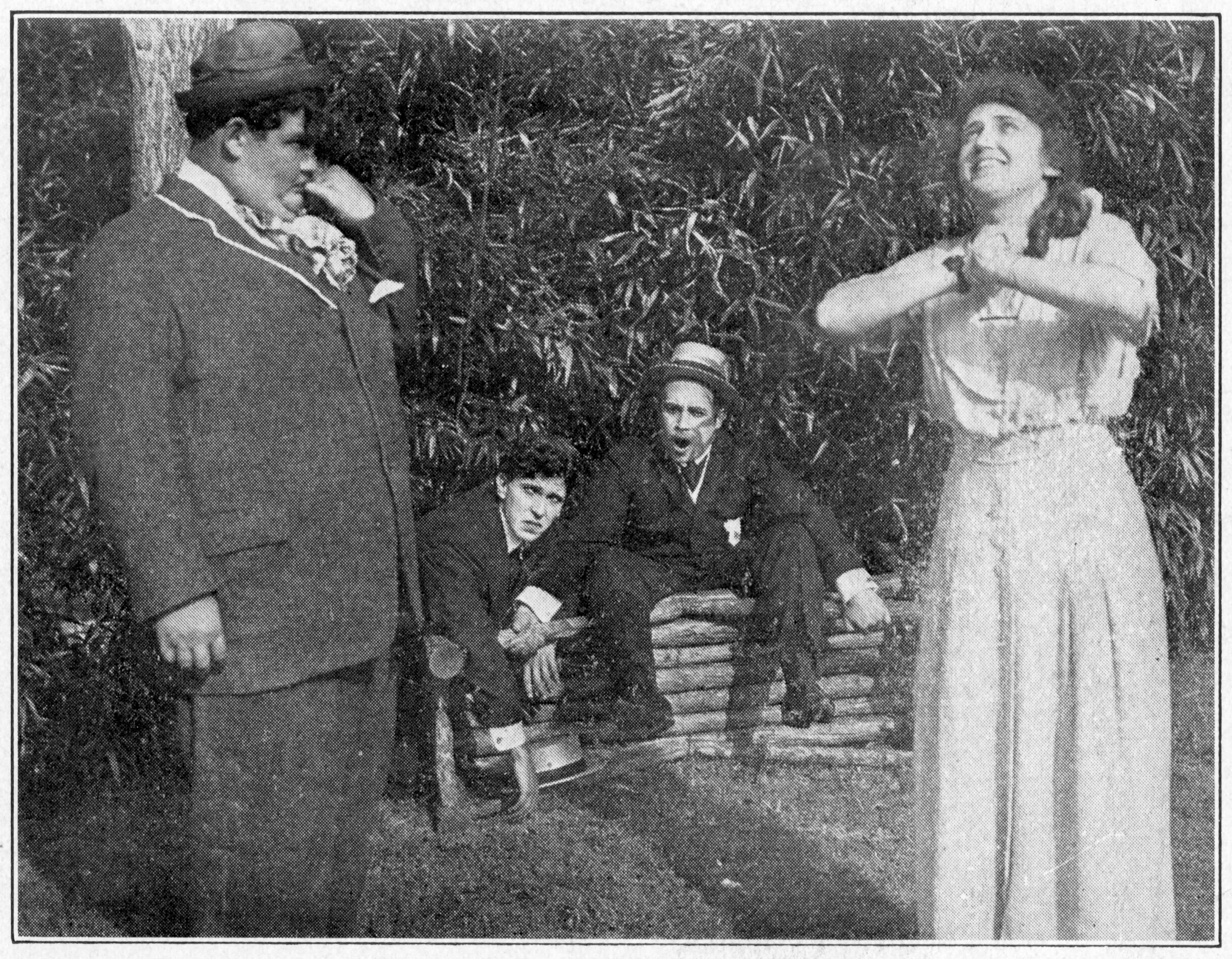
- Babe Hardy and Nellie Farran in a publicity still from Mother's Baby Boy
- Directed by: Arthur Hotaling
- Written by: Epes W. Sargent
- Produced by: Arthur Hotaling
- Starring: Oliver Hardy; Eva Bell; Nellie Farran
- Release date: November 24, 1914
- Running time: c. 5 minutes (400 feet)
- Country: United States
- Languages: Silent film English intertitles

Mother's Baby Boy is a 1914 American split-reel silent comedy film produced by the Lubin Manufacturing Company and starring Oliver Hardy, Eva Bell, and Nellie Farran.

== Plot ==
Percival is a pampered, foppish mama's boy. When he interrupts Bill and Tom during their wooing of Nell, they chase him back to his boarding house and throw bricks at him, although it is clear that Nell prefers his company to theirs. Percival writes to his mother complaining about "those horrid boys with their rude ways", and she wires back that she is coming to protect her darling son. When she arrives, she turns out to be a tiny woman, and she can't prevent Bill and Tom from continuing to beat Percival, until Nell runs into the house and brings out the prizefighter hired by Percival's mother to defend him. He makes short work of the two bullies and throws them into the sea.

Mother's Baby Boy (1914), from a nitrate print in the Library of Congress

== Cast ==
- Oliver Hardy as Percival Peachskin (billed as Babe Hardy)
- Eva Bell as Mother Peachskin
- Nellie Farron as Nell Haldane
- Don Ferrando as Tom Brown
- Burt Bucher as Bill Green
- Royal Byron as Sport Regan

== Production and reception ==
Mother's Baby Boy was written by Epes W. Sargent and produced by Arthur Hotaling, who was the general supervisor of the Jacksonville, Florida unit of the Lubin Manufacturing Company of Philadelphia. It was a short split-reel comedy, lasting approximately five minutes and sharing a single reel of film with He Wanted Chickens, an unrelated comedy also written by Sargent and starring Jerold T. Hevener, Mabel Paige, and Ben Walker. The films were released by the General Film Company on November 14, 1914, and are among a group of short comedies made by the Lubin company in 1914 and early 1915 that include the earliest screen appearances of Oliver Hardy.

The film received favorable reviews in the trade papers. Moving Picture World called it "a burlesque comedy ... which, while it is ludicrous, is creative of much laughter on the part of the spectators", and the reviewer for The Bioscope singled out Hardy's contribution: "Just another of those indescribably ludicrous love comedies, in which clever Babe Hardy (the Lubin fat fello) seems to fairly revel ... A joyous mix up ends a good, short comic."

== Preservation and home video ==
Mother's Baby Boy is one of the earliest Oliver Hardy films known to survive. It was restored in 2020 by the Library of Congress and Lobster Films from the only known nitrate print, now in the Library of Congress, and issued on the blu-ray set Laurel or Hardy: Early Solo Films of Stan Laurel and Oliver Hardy.

== See also ==
- List of American films of 1914
- Oliver Hardy filmography
