= The Candy Trail =

1916 film

- Directed by: Will Louis
- Produced by: Louis Burstein
- Starring: Oliver Hardy
- Release date: October 12, 1916
- Country: United States
- Languages: Silent film English intertitles

The Candy Trail is a 1916 American silent comedy film featuring Oliver Hardy. It was one of the "Plump and Runt" comedy shorts made by Vim Comedy Company in Jacksonville, Florida.

== Plot ==
Plump's wealthy sweetheart is swept away to the big city by his scheming rival, Runt, with promises of fame and glamour. Plump follows, and rescues her from a gang Runt has joined.

== Cast ==
- Oliver Hardy as Plump (as Babe Hardy)
- Billy Ruge as Runt
- Florence McLaughlin as Village Belle (as Florence McLoughlin)
- Bert Tracy

== See also ==
- List of American films of 1916
- Oliver Hardy filmography
