= Cleaning Time =

1915 film

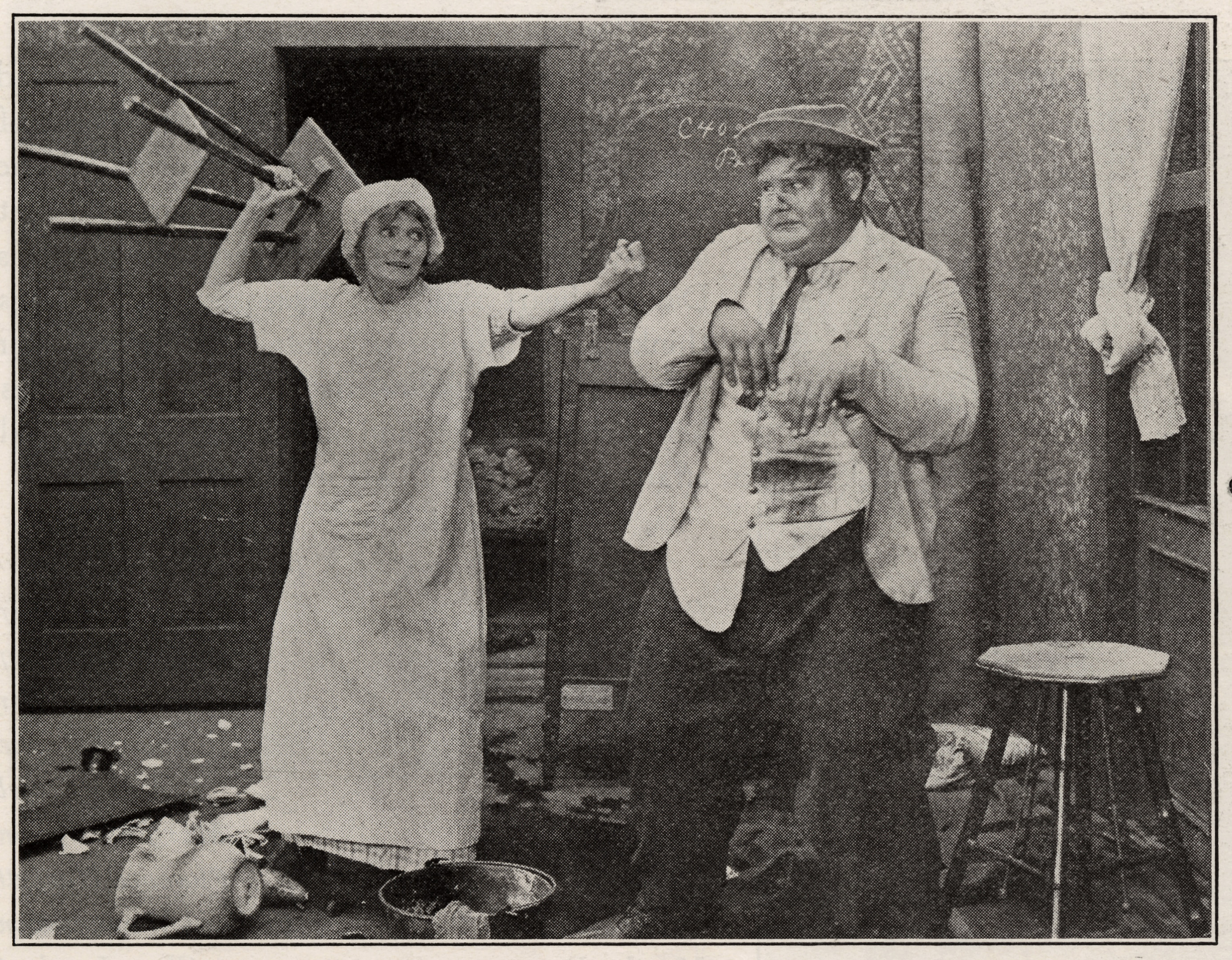
- Eva Bell and Babe Hardy in a publicity still from Cleaning Time
- Directed by: Will Louis
- Written by: Will Louis
- Produced by: Arthur Hotaling
- Starring: Oliver Hardy
- Release date: April 13, 1915
- Country: United States
- Languages: Silent film English intertitles

Cleaning Time is a 1915 American silent comedy film featuring Oliver Hardy. It was made in Jacksonville, Florida, for the Lubin Company.

== Plot ==
John Herringbone is set to doing household chores by his wife. He breaks crockery and empties dirty water into the laundry; Mrs. Herringbone attacks him for his incompetence. Sent outdoors to water the lawn, he carelessly sprays the hose at passersby, including an attractive young woman.

== Cast ==
- Oliver Hardy as John Herringbone (as Babe Hardy)
- Eva Bell as Mrs. Herringbone

== See also ==
- List of American films of 1915
- Oliver Hardy filmography
