= Safety Worst =

1915 silent comedy film by Jerold T. Hevener

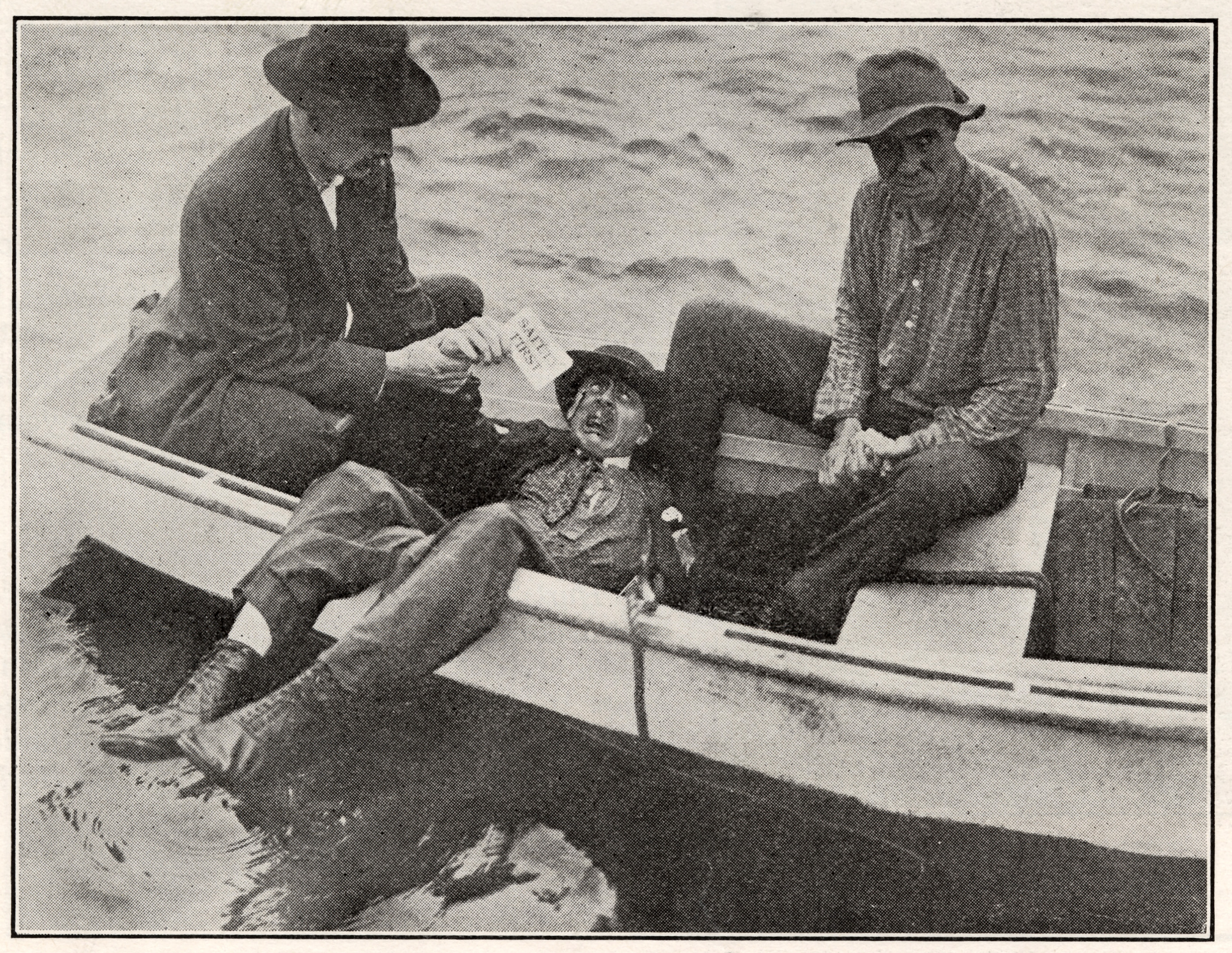
- Raymond McKee (center) in a publicity still from Safety Worst
- Directed by: Jerold T. Hevener
- Written by: Epes W. Sargent
- Produced by: Arthur Hotaling
- Starring: Raymond McKee
- Release date: May 1, 1915
- Country: United States
- Languages: Silent film English intertitles

Safety Worst is a 1915 silent comedy film featuring Oliver Hardy.

== Plot ==
This plot summary was published in The Moving Picture World for Mav 1, 1915:

Blllington Biggs is a worker in the cause of "Safety First" and gets a lot of cards of warning printed. He gives one to Bill Jones when be catches him spooning with Jane Judson. He gives one to a man who is about to lend some money to another man and gets beat up because of it. He bands a card to two men who are fighting and he gets the worst of it. He gives one to the man at the gasoline station and after the explosion he gets a can on the head that knocks him out. He stops a crowd of policemen who are chasing a burglar and bands them a card and is thrown into the river. He bands one to the men who pull him out and they proceed to throw him back again, and that is the finish of him.

== Cast ==
- Raymond McKee - Billington Biggs
- Oliver Hardy - Bill Jones (as Babe Hardy)
- Frances Ne Moyer - Jane Hudson

== See also ==
- List of American films of 1915
- Oliver Hardy filmography
