= A Special Delivery =

1916 film

- Directed by: Will Louis
- Produced by: Louis Burstein
- Starring: Oliver Hardy
- Release date: January 27, 1916
- Country: United States
- Languages: Silent film English intertitles

A Special Delivery is a 1916 American one-reel silent comedy film starring Oliver Hardy.

== Plot ==
This plot summary comes from The Moving Picture World magazine:

When Plump is informed that the stork is expected to visit his home shortly, he rushes to summon medical assistance. His peculiar actions and wild haste arouse the suspicion of the police officials, who have been on the lookout for some burglars who have recently been operating in the vicinity of the sanatorium.

Runt, tbe pride of the police force, follows Plump, but in the tussle is severely worsted. The nurses in the sanatorium are in a very nervous state owing to their dread of burglars and the least noises drives them into a panic. Plump reaches the sanatorium followed by Runt and other policemen, whom he has summoned to assist him. Plump's entrance at the sanatorium in a wild and dishevelled condition throws the nurses into a frenzy of fear, and they attempt to phone for help only to learn that a real burglar has entered the house during the excitement and has cut the telephone connection.

The screams of the nurses have been heard by Runt and his fellow-policemen and, rushing to the house, they overpower the unfortunate Plump and drag him off to the station, where the head nurse lodges a complaint of burglary against Plump. He begs the officials to release him and explains his predicament, and is finally able to convince them of the truth of his statements. On his release he rushes madly to his home, accompanied by the doctor and the head nurse and, as if Fate, desirous of making amends for his misfortunes of the earlier part of the night, Plump is rewarded by the appearance of the doctor bearing in his arms not one, but three bouncing boys.

A later review from the same magazine:

"Babe" Hardy as "Plump" and Billy Ruge as "Runt" are the leading funmakers in this one-reel farce, produced by the new Vim company. It bears a striking resemblance to the other Vim comedies — a twin brother, in fact — and is a succession of quick-moving antics by the entire cast.

— Comments on the Films, Exclusively by Our Own Staff

== Cast ==
- Oliver Hardy - Plump (as Babe Hardy)
- Billy Ruge - Runt

== See also ==
- List of American films of 1916
- Oliver Hardy filmography
