= The Precious Parcel =

1916 film

- Directed by: Will Louis (aka Willard Louis)
- Produced by: Louis Burstein
- Starring: Oliver Hardy
- Release date: October 19, 1916
- Country: United States
- Languages: Silent film English intertitles

The Precious Parcel is a 1916 American silent comedy film featuring Oliver Hardy. It is one of the films in the Plump and Runt series.

== Plot ==
This plot comes from the November, 1916 Moving Picture World magazine:

A quite humorous reel with Plump and Runt as the chief laughmakers. The story burlesques in an entertaining manner the old plot of the shipment of gold to a lonely express office and the conspiracy to steal it. Runt is the bad man and Plump the hero. Plump (Babe Hardy) and Runt (Billy Ruge) are assisted by Edna Reynolds and Florence McLoughlin.

== Cast ==
- Oliver Hardy as Plump (as Babe Hardy)
- Billy Ruge as Runt
- Florence McLaughlin as Runt's Accomplice (as Florence McLoughlin)
- Edna Reynolds as Telegraph Operator

== See also ==
- List of American films of 1916
- Oliver Hardy filmography
