= Aunt Bill =

1916 film

- Directed by: Will Louis
- Produced by: Louis Burstein
- Starring: Oliver Hardy
- Release date: July 20, 1916
- Country: United States
- Languages: Silent film English intertitles

Aunt Bill is a 1916 American silent comedy film featuring Oliver Hardy.

== Plot ==
Aunt Bill was part of the Plump and Runt series of comedy shorts featuring Oliver Hardy and Billy Ruge. In this installment, the characters' wives have a wealthy aunt. As a prank, a male friend dresses up as the aunt, but "the real aunt appears" and is outraged by the ensuing confusion. In disgust, she tears up a large check that she planned to give her nieces.

== Cast ==
- Oliver Hardy as Plump (as Babe Hardy)
- Billy Ruge as Runt
- Ray Godfrey as Mrs. Runt
- Florence McLaughlin as Mrs. Plump (as Florence McLoughlin)
- Bert Tracy as Aunt
- Billy Bletcher as Bogus Aunt

== See also ==
- List of American films of 1916
- Oliver Hardy filmography
