= A Maid to Order =

1916 film

- Directed by: Will Louis
- Produced by: Louis Burstein
- Starring: Oliver Hardy
- Release date: October 26, 1916
- Country: United States
- Languages: Silent film English intertitles

A Maid to Order is a 1916 American silent comedy film featuring Oliver Hardy.

== Plot ==
This plot synopsis appeared in The Moving Picture World for October 14, 1916:

When Raymond's frivolous young wife informs him that household duties were too hard for her, they ask Kate, the cook, where a neat maid can be secured. Kate being the proud possessor of the luxury of Plump as her husband, instantly sees a chance whereby she can keep the job in her own household and also force Plump to work for his daily bread. Informing the young couple that she knows a jewel of a maid, she hurries home and dresses Plump in some of her clothes. Both Raymond and his wife are impressed with the appearance of the new maid and try to make it as pleasant as possible for her. However, Kate's jealousy comes to the surface when she sees her loving man petted by the young wife, and Plump, to his disgust, is forced to submit to the attentions of Raymond.

Finally when the young wife discovers her husband flirting with the maid, her anger arises suddenly and she orders Plump out of the house. Raymond intercedes for the maid and matters rest until Kate again catches the wife petting Plump. Then everything is certainly all off and in the confusion Raymond learns that the supposed maid is a man, so between the three-sided attack poor Plump is done up to a frazzle.

== Cast ==
- Oliver Hardy as Plump (as Babe Hardy)
- Raymond McKee as The Man of the House
- Kate Price as Plump's Wife
- Florence McLaughlin as The Lady of the House

== See also ==
- List of American films of 1916
- Oliver Hardy filmography
