= A Warm Reception =

1916 film

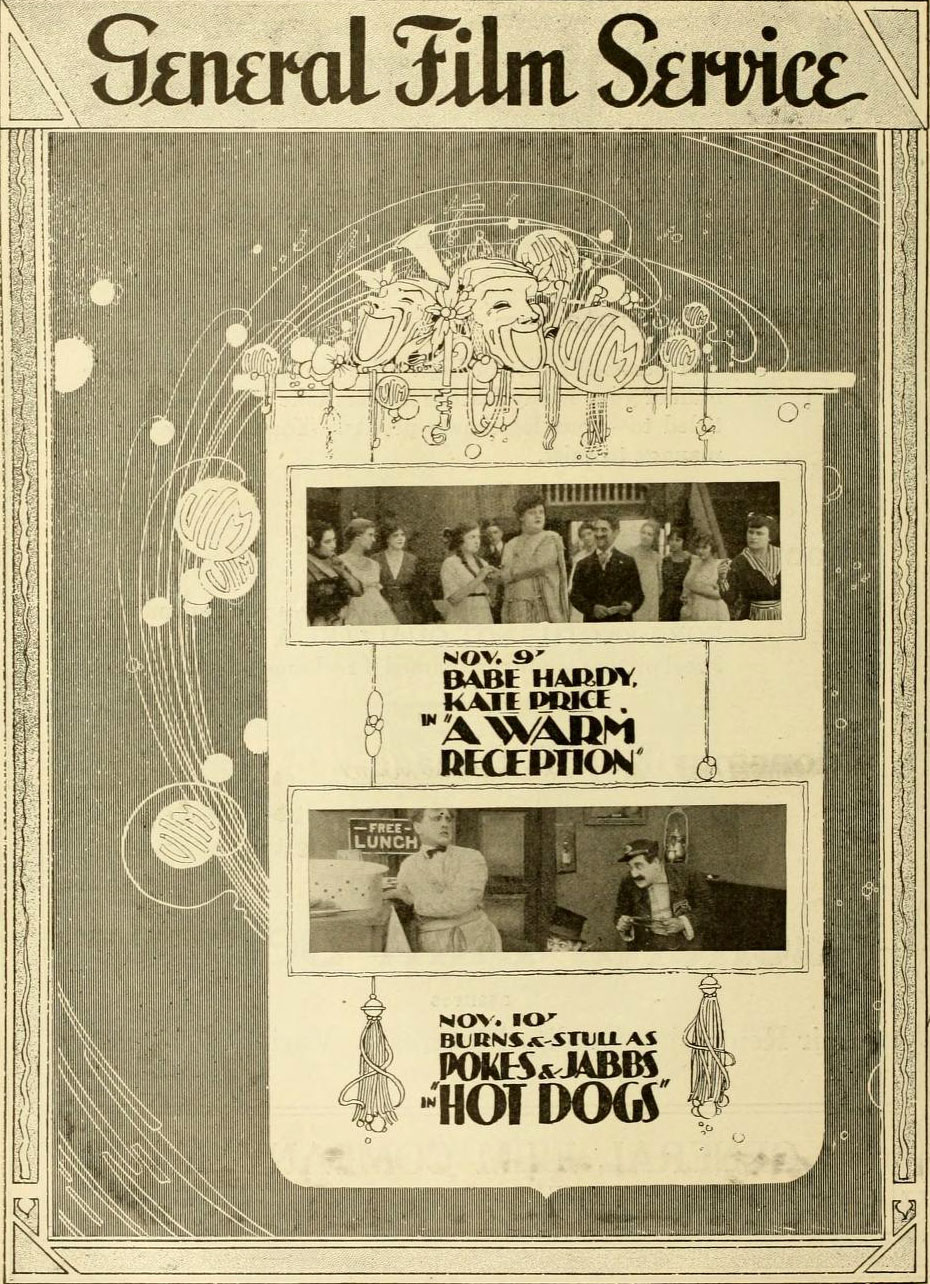
- Ad for film
- Produced by: Louis Burstein
- Starring: Oliver Hardy
- Release date: November 9, 1916
- Running time: 10-15 minutes (1-reel)
- Country: United States
- Languages: Silent film English intertitles

A Warm Reception is a 1916 lost American silent short film featuring Oliver Hardy.

== Plot ==
This plot summary was published in The Moving Picture World for November 25, 1916.

The old comedy idea of the mother who wants her daughter to marry a count is used in this reel. Babe Hardy is seen as the favored suitor of the daughter. Kate Price is the mother and Raymond McKee the count. It is the fast knockabout work of these three that lends what comedy there is to the film. It is the Count who gets the warm reception, being received by Babe masquerading as the mother.

== Cast ==
- Oliver Hardy as Babe (as Babe Hardy)
- Kate Price as Mrs. Price
- Joe Cohen as Count De Appetyte
- Florence McLaughlin as Mrs. Price's daughter (as Florence McLoughlin)

== See also ==
- List of American films of 1916
- Oliver Hardy filmography
