= A Sticky Affair =

1916 film

- Directed by: Will Louis
- Produced by: Louis Burstein
- Starring: Oliver Hardy
- Release date: February 3, 1916
- Country: United States
- Languages: Silent film English intertitles

A Sticky Affair is a 1916 American silent comedy film featuring Oliver Hardy.

== Plot ==
This plot summary was published in The Moving Picture World for February 12, 1916:

The home of Prof. Perkins, the inventor of a wonderfully adhesive glue, is under the supervision of Lena Brown. who has a penchant for brass buttons. Plump and Runt, the pride of the local police force, are rivals for Lena's hand, but Lena refuses to accept either one until they have proven themselves heroes. Each one strives to outdo the other in deeds of bravery in order to win the affections of Lena, but without success.

The city is visited by two famous crooks, who after looking over various suitable locations, initially decide to rob the house of the professor. While they are engaged in burglarizing the house, both Plump and Runt are enjoying the hospitality of Lena. The lovemaking is interrupted by the appearance of the professor, and Lena hides both Plump and Runt In the closet. They try to make their escape from there disguised in women's attire, but are discovered by the irate professor, who has also summoned the police to come to his assistance.

Plump and Runt followed by the professor and their fellow policemen are chased through the house to the roof-tops from which they try in vain to escape. In the meantime an explosion has occurred in the laboratory of the professor, causing the glue to run over the fioor. firmly entrapping the two burglars at work on the safe. They find themselves stuck fast to the glue and unable to extricate themselves from their plight.

On the roof-tops Plump and Runt after having been chased by the other policemen and the professor, hide behind the skylight through which the professor in his rush to seize the two offenders, falls through, which mishap causes Plump and Runt to follow him headlong in bis descent. They fall through the entire three floors of the house and finally land on the floor of the laboratory where they also find themselves stucic fast in the glue beside the two burglars. When they recover from the shock of the fall, Plump's first thoughts are to rescue Lena who has also been stuck fast in the glue. He succeeds in saving her thereby causing Lena to acknowledge him as her hero to the chagrin of Runt.

== Cast ==
- Oliver Hardy as Plump (as Babe Hardy)
- Billy Ruge as Runt
- Elsie MacLeod as Lena Brown (as Elsa MacLeod)
- Billy Bletcher as Professor Perkins

== See also ==
- List of American films of 1916
- Filmography of Oliver Hardy
