= Their Vacation =

1916 film

- Directed by: Will Louis
- Produced by: Louis Burstein
- Starring: Oliver Hardy
- Release date: March 30, 1916
- Country: United States
- Languages: Silent film English intertitles

Their Vacation is a 1916 American silent comedy film featuring Oliver Hardy.

== Plot ==
This plot summary comes from The Moving Picture World for April 1, 1916:

With bursting pocket books, Plump and Runt put up at the swellest hotel to spend the first stage of their vacation. For safety s sake Runt entrusts Plump with his wallet, and all goes well until Plump becomes enchanted with a pair of bright eyes belonging to a charmer who inveigles the big fellow into an invitation for an expensive dinner, during the course of which the pocket book mysteriously disappears.

Runt, in the interim, has been making the most of his opportunities with the landlord's daughter, and he presents her with a large box of candy. On asking Plump for the "necessary," Plump discovers his loss. The irate landlord puts them both to work cleaning shoes to pay for their board. Meantime, the fair crook and her partner, fearing a hue and cry after the lost cash, hide the wallet in a pair of shoes. Plump, gathering up the guests' footwear, takes away the identical pair and gives them to his little pal in distress, to clean. Hardly believing his eyes, Runt recovers their lost property and with howls of joy they awaken the landlord, pay their bills and are just in time to capture the evildoers as they attempt to escape.

== Cast ==
- Oliver Hardy – Plump (as Babe Hardy)
- Billy Ruge – Runt
- Bert Tracy
- Florence McLaughlin

== See also ==
- List of American films of 1916
- Oliver Hardy filmography
