= Hungry Hearts (1916 film) =

1916 film

- Directed by: Will Louis
- Produced by: Louis Burstein
- Starring: Oliver Hardy
- Distributed by: Vim Comedy Company
- Release date: June 15, 1916
- Country: United States
- Languages: Silent film English intertitles

Hungry Hearts is a 1916 American silent comedy short film, filmed in Jacksonville, Florida by Vim Comedy Company, and featuring a young Oliver Hardy.

== Plot ==
This plot summary appeared in The Moving Picture World for June 10, 1916:

Woes of a penniless artist whose model is an heiress, but doesn't know it, give a sprightly turn to the events which succeed each other rapidly in "Hungry Hearts," the Vim comedy release of June 15. A patron wishes to buy a full-length study of the girl en deshabille. Rather than submit her beauty to the gaze of alien eyes, the artist destroys the picture when temptation proves too strong. For this and other acts of faithfulness he wins a rich reward.

== Cast ==
- Oliver Hardy as Plump (billed as "Babe Hardy")
- Billy Ruge as Runt
- Ray Godfrey as A Model
- Edna Reynolds as A Widow
- Bert Tracy as Art Connoisseur

== See also ==
- List of American films of 1916
