= What's Sauce for the Goose =

1916 film

- Directed by: Will Louis
- Produced by: Louis Burstein
- Starring: Elsie MacLeod
- Release date: April 27, 1916
- Country: United States
- Languages: Silent film English intertitles

What's Sauce for the Goose is a 1916 film featuring Oliver Hardy.

== Cast ==
- Elsie MacLeod as Mrs. Plump
- Oliver Hardy as Mr. Boob Plump (as Babe Hardy)
- Billy Ruge as Runt

== See also ==
- List of American films of 1916
- Filmography of Oliver Hardy
