= Baby Doll (1916 film) =

1916 film

- Directed by: Will Louis
- Produced by: Louis Burstein
- Starring: Oliver Hardy
- Release date: May 25, 1916
- Country: United States
- Languages: Silent film English intertitles

Baby Doll is a 1916 silent comedy film featuring Oliver Hardy, one of a series of over thirty "Plump and Runt" one-reel comedies, made by the Vim studio in 1916.

== Plot ==
Plump and Runt are male friends who need to raise cash. Runt's uncle advises him to marry; Plump dresses as Runt's wife to convince the uncle that his advice was followed. Instead, the married uncle flirts with the dressed-up Plump. This provides an alternative means of raising money from the uncle, as payment to keep quiet about his behavior.

== Cast ==
- Oliver Hardy as Plump (as Babe Hardy)
- Billy Ruge as Runt
- Elsie MacLeod

== See also ==
- List of American films of 1916
