= Twin Flats =

1916 film

- Produced by: Louis Burstein
- Starring: Oliver Hardy
- Release date: November 2, 1916
- Country: United States
- Languages: Silent film English intertitles

Twin Flats is a 1916 American silent comedy film featuring Oliver Hardy and Kate Price.

== Plot ==
This plot summary ran in The Moving Picture World for November 25, 1916:

Portly Babe Hardy and Kate Price, also blessed with avoirdupois, are the chief funmakers in this reel. It is a good knockabout comedy number. The means Plump and his pal take to get out of their flats to the club are funny. Only Raymond gets away, and he brings several of his pals around to Plump's flat. They are routed by Kate, the wife, but hubby gets away and comes home with a bank roll, won at poker.

== Cast ==
- Oliver Hardy as Babe (as Babe Hardy)
- Kate Price as Kate
- Raymond McKee as Raymond
- Florence McLaughlin

== See also ==
- List of American films of 1916
- Oliver Hardy filmography
