= Human Hounds =

1916 film

- Directed by: Will Louis
- Produced by: Louis Burstein
- Starring: Oliver Hardy
- Release date: August 3, 1916
- Country: United States
- Languages: Silent film English intertitles

Human Hounds is a 1916 American silent comedy film starring Oliver Hardy.

== Plot ==
This plot summary comes from The Moving Picture World of August 19, 1916:

Plump and Runt are a pair of detectives in this one-reel farce. Their efforts to help a client secure a divorce from her husband, leads to considerable broad fun. The number has the vigor of action that is generally to be found in a Vim comedy.

== Cast ==
- Oliver Hardy as Plump (as Babe Hardy)
- Billy Ruge as Runt
- Bert Tracy as General Debility
- Ray Godfrey as Mrs. Debility
- Joe Cohen as Count de Lummox
- Madge Cohen as Countess de Lummox

== See also ==
- List of American films of 1916
- Oliver Hardy filmography
