= Their Honeymoon =

1916 film

- Directed by: Will Louis
- Produced by: Louis Burstein
- Starring: Oliver Hardy
- Release date: August 24, 1916
- Country: United States
- Languages: Silent film English intertitles

Their Honeymoon is a 1916 American silent comedy film starring Oliver Hardy. The copyright was not registered.

== Plot ==
This plot was published in The Moving Picture World magazine:

Starting on their honeymoon, young Mrs. Plump decides to carry her cash in the form of gold pieces sewed on her coat as buttons. Attacked by tramps, the coat is stolen and the shock makes ma-in-law ill. Wifey telephone to Mr. Plump to hasten home. He is arrested for speeding and put in jail. Here he recognizes one of the thugs, pinched for another crime. The judge is told of the thug's attack and Plump phones to tell wifey of his capture. The lost coat is discovered among the tramp's belongings and Plump, tearing off one of the buttons, cheerfully pays his fine and once more breathes the fresh air.

== Cast ==
- Oliver Hardy - Mr. Plump (as Babe Hardy)
- Billy Ruge - Runt
- Edna Reynolds - Mother-in-law
- Ray Godfrey - Mrs. Plump
- Frank Hanson - A Tramp

== See also ==
- List of American films of 1916
- Oliver Hardy filmography
