= An Aerial Joyride =

1916 film

- Directed by: Will Louis
- Produced by: Louis Burstein
- Starring: Oliver Hardy
- Release date: August 31, 1916
- Country: United States
- Languages: Silent film English intertitles

An Aerial Joyride is a 1916 American silent comedy film featuring Oliver Hardy.

== Cast ==
- Oliver Hardy as Plump
- Billy Ruge as Runt
- Ray Godfrey as Sweetheart

== See also ==
- List of American films of 1916
- Oliver Hardy filmography
