= Dreamy Knights =

1916 film

- Directed by: Will Louis
- Produced by: Louis Burstein
- Starring: Oliver Hardy
- Release date: August 10, 1916
- Country: United States
- Languages: Silent film English intertitles

Dreamy Knights is a 1916 American silent comedy film featuring Oliver Hardy.

== Plot ==
This plot summary was published in The Moving Picture World for August 26, 1916:

An amusing burlesque of Cervante's (sic) immortal "Don Quixote" is the theme of this one-reel picture, Babe Hardy, Billy Ruge and Ray Podfrey heading the cast. Plump and Runt are discovered fishing from a boat. They go to sleep and dream they are the heroes of a great adventure. Although still in the present century, they imagine that they are a pair of bold knights whose mission is to rescue beauty in distress and defeat villainy at every turn. A captured maiden is freed by them, and a pirate stronghold overthrown. Their gallant steeds are an undersized donkey and an underfed goat. Plump and Runt make a ludicrous pair of swashbucklers, until awakened from their pleasant dreams by the upsetting of the boat.

== Cast ==
- Oliver Hardy as Plump (as Babe Hardy)
- Billy Ruge as Runt
- Ray Godfrey as Maiden in distress
- Bert Tracy

== See also ==
- List of American films of 1916
- Oliver Hardy filmography
