= The Guilty Ones =

1916 film by Oliver Hardy

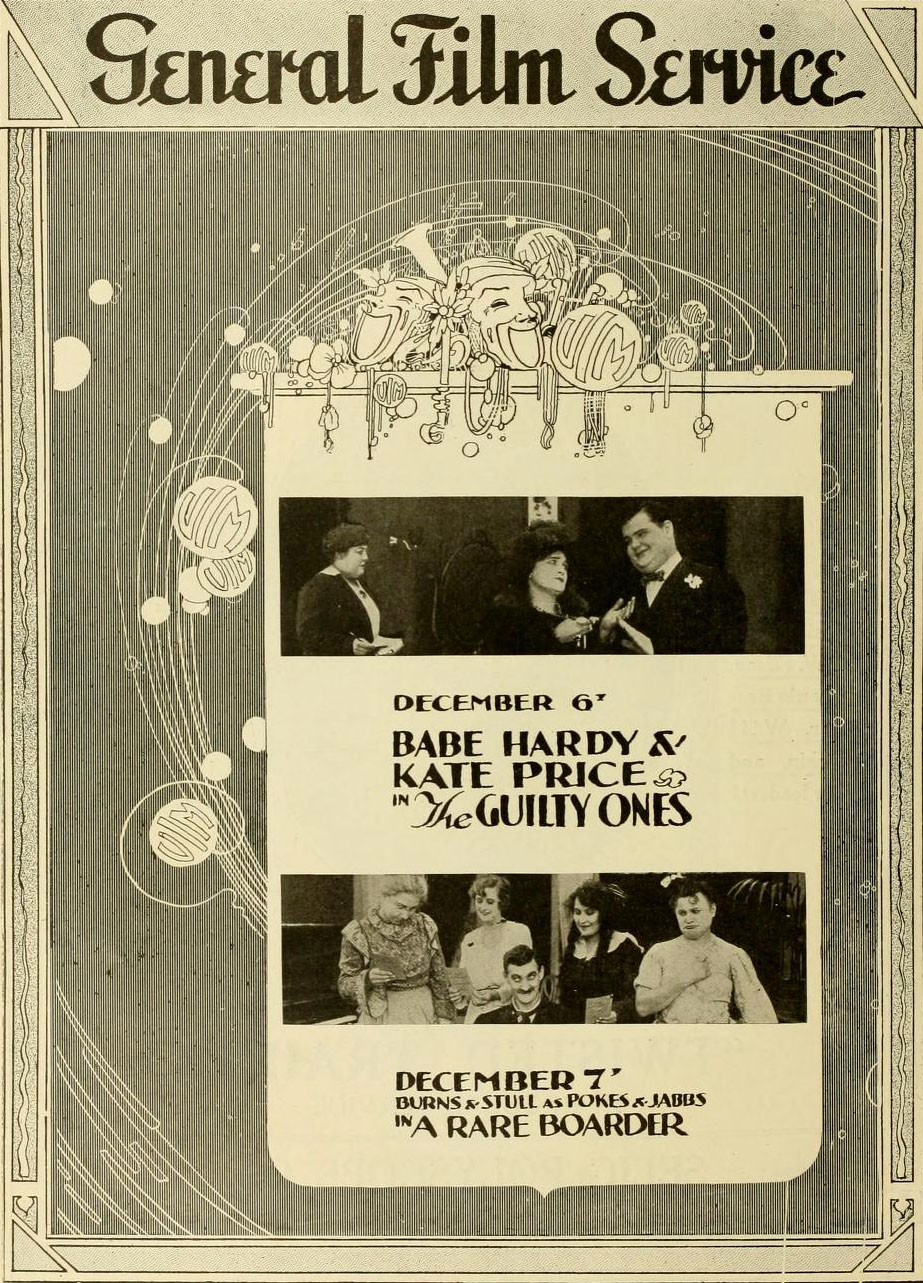
- Directed by: Oliver Hardy
- Produced by: Louis Burstein
- Starring: Oliver Hardy
- Release date: December 6, 1916
- Country: United States
- Languages: Silent film English intertitles

The Guilty Ones is a 1916 American comedy film directed by and starring Oliver Hardy. It was the first film to be directed by Hardy.

== Plot ==
This plot summary was published in The Moving Picture World for December 16, 1916:

Babe and Kate, two ex-convicts and former underworld pals, have drifted apart since their prison days. Kate has reformed and is now a reporter in a distant city. Babe, overflowing with ideas of how to separate the unsuspected citizens of their hard earned cash, comes to the city. Creating some comment by his free way of dispensing coin, the newspaper sends Kate to interview the illustrious stranger. When Kate recognizes Babe, she almost faints, but Babe, by his suave speech, shows Kate that if she will join him ir. bis scheme they will reap a fortune. The two insert a notice in the paper to the effect that the man who is so anxious to conceal a certain questionable deal had better pay hush money at once to Babe or his arrest will soon follow the exposure.

The result of the notice is extraordinary, as it appears that every man in town has pulled off a questionable deal. Just as the two crooks are about to leave the city with their ill-earned gain, their Nemesis appears in the form of an amateur detective, who has overheard their plans. Babe and Kate are arrested.

== Cast ==
- Oliver Hardy as Babe (as Babe Hardy)
- Kate Price as Kate
- Billy Ruge as A Detective

== See also ==
- List of American films of 1916
