= The Boycotted Baby =

1917 film

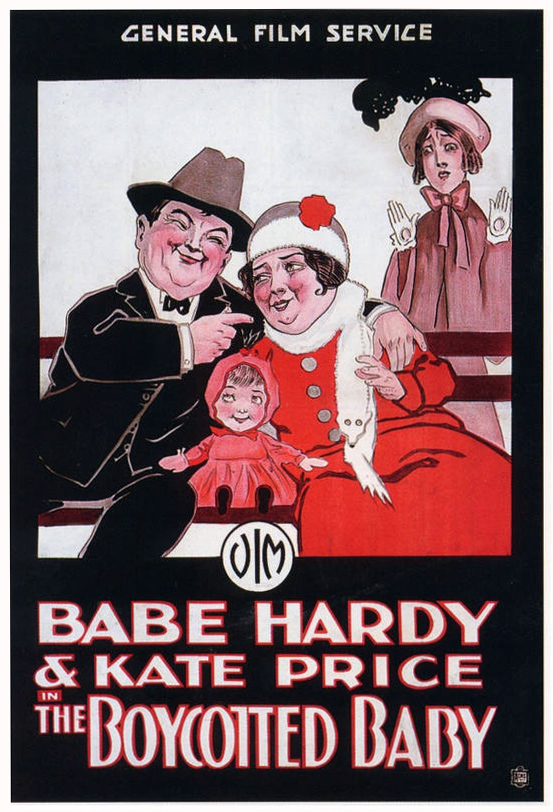
- Directed by: Oliver Hardy
- Produced by: Louis Burstein
- Starring: Oliver Hardy
- Release date: January 4, 1917
- Country: United States
- Language: Silent with English intertitles

The Boycotted Baby is a 1917 American silent comedy film directed by and starring Oliver Hardy.

== Plot ==
Babe (Oliver Hardy) and Kate (Kate Price) are sweethearts. They live in the rather conservative town of Cordeliaville where there are laws which prohibit both romancing and babies. A new mother arrives in Cordeliaville and notices the sign. Rather than leaving town, the mother leaves her baby... at Kate's doorstep. Kate and Babe try to hide the baby which, in turn, gets passed from person to person until it is reunited with the mother. "The humor is too suggestive at times," noted The Moving Picture World.

== Cast ==
- Oliver Hardy as Babe (as Babe Hardy)
- Kate Price as Kate

== See also ==
- List of American films of 1917
