= Mother's Child =

1916 film

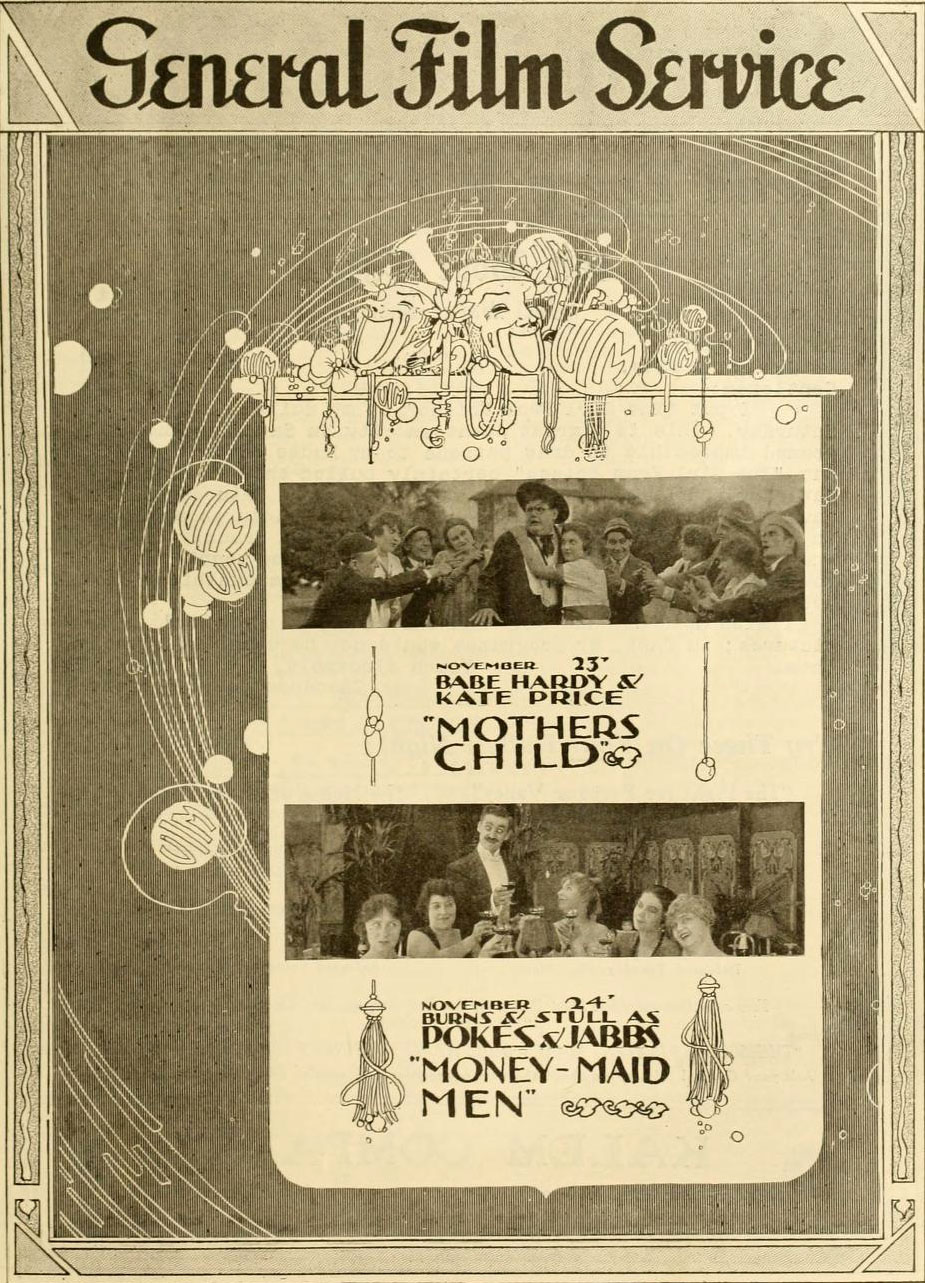
- Film poster
- Directed by: Oliver Hardy; Will Louis
- Produced by: Louis Burstein
- Starring: Oliver Hardy
- Release date: November 23, 1916
- Country: United States
- Languages: Silent film English intertitles

Mother's Child is a 1916 American silent comedy film featuring Oliver Hardy.

== Plot ==
This plot summary comes from The Moving Picture World for December 9, 1916:

A quite fast knockabout comedy reel, with Babe Hardy and Kate Price the leaders. Babe goes to college and falls for one of the co-eds. This brings him before the upper classmen, who haze him considerable, but the tables are turned when mother gets on the job and, disguised, gives the classmen some of their own medicine

== Cast ==
- Oliver Hardy as Babe (as Babe Hardy)
- Kate Price as His mother
- Joe Cohen as Tom
- Florence McLaughlin as Florence (as Florence McLoughlin)

== See also ==
- List of American films of 1916
