= Sidetracked (1916 film) =

1916 film

- Directed by: Will Louis
- Produced by: Louis Burstein
- Starring: Oliver Hardy
- Release date: September 7, 1916
- Country: United States
- Languages: Silent film English intertitles

Sidetracked, often written as Side-Tracked, is a 1916 American silent comedy film featuring Oliver Hardy.

== Plot ==
This plot summary comes from The Moving Picture World for September 9, 1916:

The newlyweds, Mr. and Mrs. Runt, start out on their honeymoon, and through the extreme affability of Plump, a drummer, trouble commences. Longing for a smoke, the bridegroom strolls to the smoker. Here he falls asleep, and the switching during the night of his end of the train leaves him miles away from his little wife. Meantime Plump does all he can to allay her anxiety, eventually escorting her to a hotel and promising to find her missing spouse. Runt manages to start on his return journey. He gets into trouble again with the minions of the law. Arriving at the hotel, he rushes to his wife's room in time to meet Plump leaving. Jealousy, rage and murder fly through the air, and the innocent drummer makes a hurried exit to the accompaniment of a fusilade of pistol shots. Through the street, up and down fire-escapes they go while the hotel is in an uproar. Fortunately, or otherwise, the pursued one finds his way unseen, as he thinks, into one of the rooms and proceeds to hide himself. Runt, exhausted with his murderous chase, returns to his room and, seeing his loved one in tears, relents and takes wifey in his arms. Plump, cramped in his hiding place and thinking the coast clear, emerges and disturbs the little scene. Once more the dogs are let loose and Runt gets up on his hind legs. Oil is poured on the troubled waters by a double explanation and instead of being carried out in bits Plump is admitted into the bosom of the Runt family.

== Cast ==
- Oliver Hardy - Plump (as Babe Hardy)
- Billy Ruge - Runt
- Robin Williamson - Porter
- Melba Andrews - Mrs. Runt

== See also ==
- List of American films of 1916
