= Life Savers (film) =

1916 film

- Directed by: Will Louis
- Produced by: Louis Burstein
- Starring: Oliver Hardy
- Release date: August 17, 1916
- Country: United States
- Languages: Silent film English intertitles

Life Savers is a 1916 American silent comedy film featuring Oliver Hardy.

== Plot ==
This plot summary comes from The Moving Picture World for the week of August 19, 1916:

Though Plump and Runt had yet to save the first life, it was through no fault of theirs, for the one with his antediluvian flivver and the other with bis leaky old boat spent the days hoping that someone would give them the opportunity they so anxiously longed for. The visit of the beautiful young diver. Miss Aqua, accompanied by her manager, caused the break between our heroes. Each fell for her charms and sought means to humiliate the other. Love and jealousy occupied all their thoughts. First one, then the other would be favored by the diver's smiles, until, driven almost craty. Runt decides to get rid of his fat rival by digging a hole under the water, and enticing there his hated one-time pal. A klttisb old maid is the first victim, and poor Plump, attempting to rescue her, himself falls In and the two are buried in the ocean bed. The victor now escorts his loved one Into the water, thinking to gloat over his rival's destruction, but, remorse seizing him. he aids in the rescue of the almost choked Plump. The diver now gives an exhibition of her powers and, pretending to be overcome, the two gallants dash to her rescue by boat and flivver. The flivver arrives first, but explodes, throwing its occupants high in the air and upsetting Runt, who is now over the spot In his boat. However, their united efforts bring the charmer safely to land, where, to their horror, they are met aod thanked by the lady's husband. Once more, their best intentions foiled. Plump and his pal cool their fevered and disappointed brows beneath the salty waves.

This plot summary comes from The Moving Picture World for the week of September 2, 1916:

Several of the scenes in this one reel comedy take place on the bottom of the ocean, and the illusion is skillfully maintained. Plump and Runt are the leaders in the cast and the director has devised considerable amusing business. The finish is novel.

== Cast ==
- Oliver Hardy as Plump (as Babe Hardy)
- Billy Ruge as Runt
- Ray Godfrey as Miss Aqua
- Helen Gilmore as Old Maid
- Dad Bates as Neptune

== See also ==
- List of American films of 1916
