= One Too Many (1916 film) =

1916 film

- Full film
- Directed by: Will Louis
- Produced by: Louis Burstein
- Starring: Oliver Hardy
- Release date: February 17, 1916
- Running time: 16 minutes
- Country: United States
- Language: Silent with English intertitles

One Too Many is a 1916 American silent film starring Oliver Hardy.

== Plot ==
Plump wakes with a hangover. He finds a note under the door from his uncle saying he will visit him "and his wife and baby" at 2 o'clock. It is 11am and he has no wife and baby. He is staying in a hotel. The bellboy is trying to take a heavy trunk upstairs. He gives the bellboy $50 to find him a baby. He finds a toddler in another room and is then asked to find a wife. Plump's friend Roy enters the room with the child and moves the child. The bellboy bribes the janitor's wife to play Plump's wife. He goes outside and hires a baby from a woman.

Meanwhile Plump finds the first baby and takes it back. The bellboy is collecting children including a little black girl. The first child's mother returns and finds her child with Plump. She takes him away but Roy steals it again. He hides in a cupboard. The bellboy brings a cot up and Plump pays him to "be the baby". Uncle John arrives as Plump is shaving he stubble off his baby. The child starts crying from he cupboard... then the wives begin to appear.

== Cast ==
- Oliver Hardy as Plump (as Babe Hardy)
- Billy Ruge as Runt
- Billy Bletcher as Unhappy Boarder
- Joe Cohen
- Edna Reynolds as Newlywed
- Madelyn Hardy as Woman on street

== See also ==
- List of American films of 1916
