= Love and Duty (1916 film) =

1916 film

- Directed by: Will Louis
- Produced by: Louis Burstein
- Starring: Oliver Hardy
- Release date: September 21, 1916
- Running time: 11 minutes
- Country: United States
- Languages: Silent film English intertitles

Love and Duty is a 1916 American silent comedy film featuring Oliver Hardy.

== Plot ==
This plot summary comes from The Moving Picture World, September 23, 1916:

The bugle's call rouses Private Plump and he hurries to Lieutenant Runt's tent to aid his pompous little superior's dressing. Secure la his authority, the officer tortures poor Plump with unnecessary drilling and departs for the day's work. The colonel's daughter loves Plump. The lieutenant loves her. Plump's heart is given to the little pet of the regiment, so that things are rather mixed.

A trumped up charge places Plump In the court martial's bands and unthinkingly the colonel sentences him to death. Risking her life the pet aids him to escape. About this time the manoeuvers are taking place and the bursting of a cannon scatters the troops and sends the colonel's horse away on a mad gallop ending in a flying jump Into the river. Plump sees this and rushes off to a crane, jumps into the scoop and with a mighty heave drags out the drowning colonel. Before the whole regiment the hero Is now restored, decorated and promoted, and with the pet in his arms, his happy future Is assured.

== Cast ==
- Oliver Hardy – Pvt. Plump (as Babe Hardy)
- Billy Ruge – Lt. Runt
- Bert Tracy – Col. Tracy
- Florence McLaughlin – His daughter (as Florence McLoughlin)
- Ray Godfrey – The sweetheart of the regiment

== See also ==
- List of American films of 1916
