= Pipe Dreams (1916 film) =

1916 film

- Directed by: Will Louis
- Produced by: Louis Burstein
- Starring: Kate Price
- Release date: November 16, 1916
- Country: United States
- Languages: Silent film English intertitles

Pipe Dreams is a 1916 American short comedy film featuring Oliver Hardy.

== Cast ==
- Kate Price as Maggie
- Oliver Hardy as Babe (as Babe Hardy)
- Joe Cohen as Butler
- Edna Reynolds as Maid

== See also ==
- List of American films of 1916
