= The Love Bugs =

1917 film

- Directed by: Oliver Hardy
- Produced by: Louis Burstein
- Starring: Oliver Hardy
- Release date: January 25, 1917
- Country: United States
- Languages: Silent film English intertitles

The Love Bugs is a 1917 American silent comedy film directed by and starring Oliver Hardy and Kate Price.

== Cast ==
- Oliver Hardy as Babe (as Babe Hardy)
- Kate Price
- Joe Cohen as Cohen
- Florence McLaughlin

== See also ==
- List of American films of 1917
