= The Heroes (1916 film) =

1916 film

- Directed by: Will Louis
- Produced by: Louis Burstein
- Starring: Oliver Hardy
- Release date: July 27, 1916
- Country: United States
- Language: Silent with English intertitles

The Heroes is a 1916 American short comedy film starring Oliver Hardy.

== Plot ==
This plot summary was published in The Moving Picture World for August 5, 1916:

Day succeeded day in one happy sequence for Plump and Runt. Occasionally they caught the drift of their teacher's meaning; often they did not. but what matter? Had they not beanshoot ers, tacks and other little things with which to annoy him? Was not Ray the object of their youthful passion, also a member of their class, and did they not rob every orchard for her delectation?

One day the circus arrived in town and then began the trouble. Fascinated by the tales of the flashy agent, Ray vanishes and Plump and Runt are left alone. They take up the trail and at last locate the circus In a distant town. To their horror they recognize Kay as the High Diver as she stands poised for her terrific drop through space. As she hits the water her lovers also dive in and pandemonium reigns. Down comes the tent, over goes the tank, and the villainous circus man counts more stars than ever were in the firmament as the reunited trio set out for their peaceful country home.

== Cast ==
- Oliver Hardy as Plump (as Babe Hardy)
- Billy Ruge as Runt
- Ray Godfrey as Plump's and Runt's sweetheart
- Bert Tracy as Schoolmaster
- Joe Cohen as Circus Agent

== See also ==
- List of American films of 1916
