= Sea Dogs (film) =

1916 film

The Sea Dogs
- Directed by: Will Louis
- Produced by: Louis Burstein
- Starring: Oliver Hardy
- Release date: June 8, 1916
- Country: United States
- Languages: Silent film English intertitles

The Sea Dogs is a 1916 American silent comedy film featuring Oliver Hardy.

== Plot ==
This plot summary comes from Moving Picture World magazine for June 3, 1916, before it was released:

Remarkable scenes photographed under water enhance the brisk comedy of "The Sea Dogs," the Vim release of June 8. The rescue of a family of castaways is effected by the simple expedient of towing a boat which drifts to their island. The towing is done by Babe Hardy, the famous "Plump," who walks along the sea bottom, pulling the painter of the boat, in which six persons are seated. Several other cleverly devised scenes lift this picture out of the ordinary run, including the antics of a hawser which obligingly ties itself into knots at the right moment.

This summary comes from Moving Picture World magazine for June 17, 1916:

Basking in the rays of the sun, Plump and Runt are rudely awakened by some overworked sailors and offered work. "Who ever worked, while the larder was full?" answers Plump, showing their larder, a two-week old weeny. Disgusted, the sailors plan to shanghai the two loafers and our two heroes, some days later, awake to find themselves at sea. They are put to work now, but, diving overboard, after a three days' swim land on a desert isle, where they meet a family of castaways. Here an ideal life is led. Between intervals of eating the tropical fruits and sleeping, the pair make love to the daughters of the family and everything goes happy as the marriage bell. One day a small boat is sighted and the whole crowd embark, only to find that the oars are missing. What is to be done? An idea strikes one of their number. A rope is tied around Plump's neck, and, much against his wish, he is pushed into the water and the long voyage starts. After several days the loiterers on a distant shore observe a boat approaching with no visible means of propulsion. Nearer and nearer it comes and, to their amazement, a head appears from the depths, followed by the big body of Plump, terribly tired, but happy after his long walk on the ocean's bed.

This plot summary comes from Moving Picture World magazine for June 24, 1916, after its release:

Several of the incidents in this one-reel farce are not only good for a hearty laugh, but required a deal of hard work and expense to transfer them to the screen. Plump and Runt are the chief fun-makers, and the scenes where Plump is forced to tow the boat while walking on the bottom of the sea, is one of the best features of the reel.

== Cast ==
- Oliver Hardy - Plump (as Babe Hardy)
- Billy Ruge - Runt
- Bert Tracy
- Ray Godfrey

== See also ==
- List of American films of 1916
