= Royal Blood (film) =

1916 film

- Directed by: Will Louis
- Produced by: Louis Burstein
- Starring: Oliver Hardy
- Release date: October 5, 1916
- Country: United States
- Languages: Silent film English intertitles

Royal Blood is a 1916 American silent comedy film starring Oliver Hardy.

== Plot ==
Mrs Vandergrift wants her daughter to marry a count. However, in spite of mother's best efforts, the daughter is in love with Plump. To win over Mrs Vandergrift, Plump and his pal Runt dress up in fancy clothes and pose as members of society. Their efforts to appear distinguished fail miserably and the count arrives on the scene to complicate matters. But in the end, Mrs. Vandergrift changes her mind anyway, and she gives Plump and her daughter her blessings.

This plot comes from The Moving Picture World for October 21, 1916:

A fair comedy number, with Plump and Runt doing their best with a rather poor story. The girl's mother wants her to marry nobility. She chooses red rather than blue blood. Plump and Runt get over a few laughs in their attempts to appear aristocratic, and the fur begins to fly when the real count appears.

== Cast ==
- Oliver Hardy - Plump (as Babe Hardy)
- Billy Ruge - Runt
- Edna Reynolds - Mrs. Vandergrift
- Ray Godfrey - Her daughter
- Bert Tracy - The Count
- Florence McLaughlin

== See also ==
- List of American films of 1916
