= He Winked and Won =

1916 film

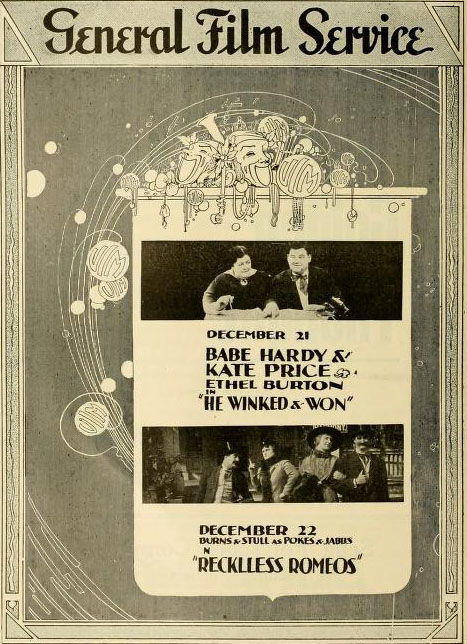
- Directed by: Oliver Hardy
- Produced by: Louis Burstein
- Starring: Oliver Hardy
- Release date: December 21, 1916
- Country: United States
- Languages: Silent film English intertitles

He Winked and Won is a 1916 American comedy film directed by and starring Oliver Hardy.

== Cast ==
- Oliver Hardy as Babe (as Babe Hardy)
- Kate Price as Kate
- Ethel Marie Burton as Ethel (as Ethel Burton)
- Florence McLaughlin as Florence (as Florence McLoughlin)

== See also ==
- List of American films of 1916
