= The Serenade (film) =

1916 film

- Directed by: Will Louis (*aka Willard Louis)
- Produced by: Louis Burstein
- Starring: Oliver Hardy
- Release date: March 2, 1916
- Running time: 14 minutes
- Country: United States
- Language: Silent with English intertitles

The Serenade is a 1916 American silent comedy short film featuring Oliver Hardy. This film survives at the Library of Congress cataloged as Jim The Serenade.

== Cast ==
- Oliver Hardy - Plump (as Babe Hardy)
- Billy Ruge - Runt
- Billy Bletcher - Schmitte
- Florence McLaughlin - Florence (as Florence McLoughlin)

== See also ==
- List of American films of 1916
