= The Reformers (film) =

1916 film

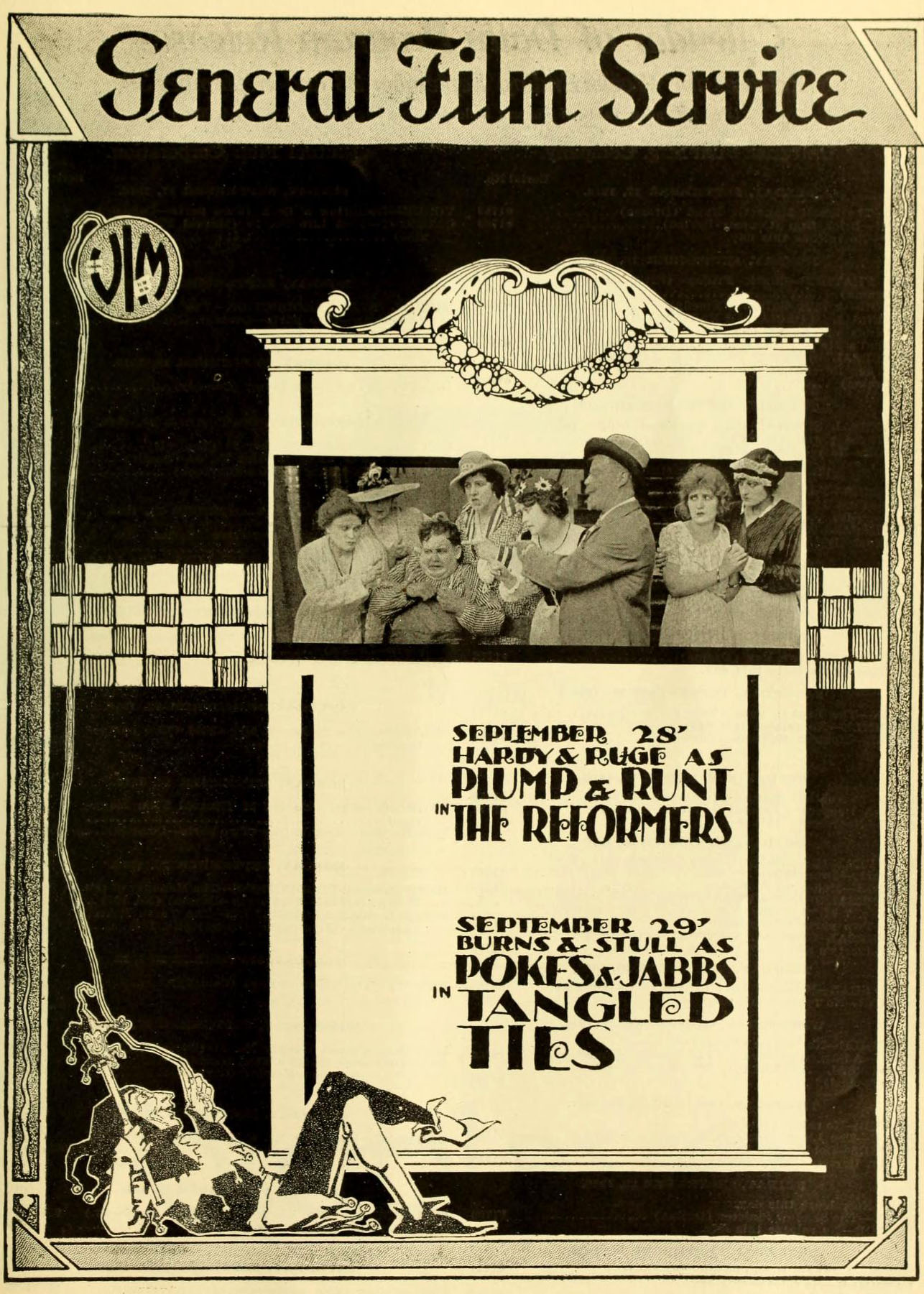
- Directed by: Will Louis
- Produced by: Louis Burstein
- Starring: Oliver Hardy
- Distributed by: General Film Company
- Release date: September 28, 1916
- Country: United States
- Language: Silent (English intertitles)

The Reformers is a 1916 American silent comedy film featuring Oliver Hardy.

== Cast ==
- Oliver Hardy as Plump (credited as Babe Hardy)
- Billy Ruge as Runt
- Florence McLaughlin as Vampire (credited as Florence McLoughlin)
- Edna Reynolds as Mrs. Ogden
- Ray Godfrey as Her daughter
- Bert Tracy as Her son

== See also ==
- List of American films of 1916
