= Stranded (1916 comedy film) =

- Directed by: Will Louis
- Produced by: Louis Burstein
- Starring: Oliver Hardy
- Production company: Vim Comedy Films
- Distributed by: General Film Company
- Release date: September 14, 1916
- Country: United States
- Languages: Silent film English intertitles

Stranded is a 1916 American silent comedy film featuring Oliver Hardy.

== Plot ==
This plot summary was published in The Moving Picture World for September 16, 1916:

Tired of business worries and an endless round of social activities, Plump and Runt board their speed boat, the Scum, and sail for the wilds. At sea their attention attracted by a strange object, they make a close examination and then—Crash! Bang! Oblivion. Consciousness returned, their boat in splinters and themselves all but dead, the conclusion slowly forces itself on them that they landed on a target at the very moment the artillery let loose.

After a long swim they crawl ashore and fall asleep. Time passes and millionaire Slocum and friends choose the same spot for their camp. His daughter's wealth and beauty have attracted the attention of an adventurer and he arrives to press his suit, in spite of the girl's evident dislike. Out hunting, the beauty disturbs Plump's slumbers by a shot thus bringing about an introduction. A sportsman to the backbone, the old man goes fishing and loses his artificial teeth. Our heroes restore them. The villain, mad with jealousy, seizes the girl and sails away with her. A wonderful shot from Plump's rifle and down comes the sail. Foiled again, the bad man places a bomb on the craft, ties up the girl, and leaves her to her fate. Plump and Runt rescue her, throw away the bomb, which blows up the escaping scoundrel.

== Cast ==
- Oliver Hardy as Plump (as Babe Hardy)
- Billy Ruge as Runt
- Frank Hanson as Millionaire Slocum
- Ray Godfrey as Slocum's daughter
- Florence McLaughlin as Slocum's daughter (as Florence McLoughlin)
- Robin Williamson as An unwanted suitor
- Bert Tracy

== See also ==
- List of American films of 1916
