= The Schemers (1916 film) =

1916 film

- Directed by: Will Louis
- Produced by: Louis Burstein
- Starring: Oliver Hardy
- Release date: June 1, 1916
- Country: United States
- Languages: Silent film English intertitles

The Schemers is a 1916 American silent comedy film featuring Oliver Hardy.

== Plot ==
This plot synopsis comes from The Moving Picture World for June 10, 1916:

Plump was a young man. His thoughts were of love, also of his spring, for it was that to bring him a fortune. Runt, his rival, thought otherwise. Elsie the object of their affections, was undecided, and so the story opens.

First she bestowed her favors on Plump, then on Runt. The spring on Plump's farm is known to possess valuable mineral qualities and a larger offer is made to Plump to sell. He leaves for the city to escort the financier over his property and during his absence, Runt persuades the fickle Elsie to marry him.

Accompanied by his pretty stenographer, the promoter arrives at the farm, where poor Plump learns of his rival's wedding. However, the blow is softened by the little stenographer's sympathy. Not satisfied with winning Elsie, Runt plans to ruin the spring and runs oil into it. Arrived at the spring, Plump is on the point of accepting the cash, when the stenographer discovers that it is an oil well and whispers to Plump to double his price. This he does and once more virtue triumphs over villainy.

== Cast ==
- Oliver Hardy - Plump (as Babe Hardy)
- Billy Ruge - Runt
- Elsie MacLeod - Elsie
- Florence McLaughlin - Stenographer (as Florence McLoughlin)

== See also ==
- List of American films of 1916
