= Fat and Fickle =

1916 film

- Directed by: Oliver Hardy
- Produced by: Louis Burstein
- Starring: Oliver Hardy
- Release date: December 28, 1916
- Country: United States
- Languages: Silent film English intertitles

Fat and Fickle is a 1916 American comedy film directed by and starring Oliver Hardy.

== Plot ==
This plot summary appeared in The Moving Picture World for January 6, 1917:

Babe is happy over his engagement to Florence, but the minute he thinks of breaking the news to her mother. Kate, his dream of Joy is ended. For Kate's ex-husband was a pugilist and his friends always considered him "some pug," yet at home he was Kate's little lambkin, for Kate carried a wallop in each hand that had a bigger kick than a Krupp gun. Babe thought "safety first" should be his motto ; yet, instead of being rough with him when she heard the news, Kate only smothered Babe with hugs.

Later, however. Babe meets Ethel, a blonde vampire who drives all thoughts of home and Florence out of Babe's head until the time came to tell Florence that she was no longer a member of the "engagement club." Kate hears the news and her past training with her ex-hubby stands her to good effect until Babe, declaring truce, proclaims Kate the lady of bis choice.

Trouble begins between Florence and ber mother over the possession of Babe. During the melee Babe escapes and seeks safety at the side of Ethel, only to receive an awful blow when he learns Ethel already owns a husband. Then Babe figured, although her mother may be a little rough, It was cheaper to get married than to work, so Babe beats It back to Florence and Kate, where a happy reunion occurs.

== Cast ==
- Oliver Hardy as Babe (as Babe Hardy)
- Kate Price as Kate
- Ethel Marie Burton as Ethel (as Ethel Burton)
- Florence McLaughlin as Florence (as Florence McLoughlin)

== See also ==
- List of American films of 1916
