= Spaghetti (film) =

1916 film

- Directed by: Will Louis
- Produced by: Louis Burstein
- Starring: Oliver Hardy
- Release date: July 13, 1916
- Running time: 1 reel
- Country: United States
- Languages: Silent film English intertitles

Spaghetti is a 1916 American lost silent comedy film featuring Oliver Hardy.

== Plot ==
This plot summary comes from Motography magazine for the week of July 15, 1916:

Between attending to business calls and endeavoring to keep his assistants from making love to his pretty cashier, Runt has his hands full. To mend matters, his chef spoils the meal of a regular customer and he, being a typical son of Sunny Italy, shows his disapproval by trying to divert the circulation of the culinary artist's blood. In despair, Runt employs Plump as head chef. The latter's gifts are more in the line of lovemaking than in preparing the menu and Runt discovers to his horror that he has only added another nuisance to his establishment. Things go from bad to worse. The Italian gentleman calls for another meal and Plump's cooking sends him into a couple of fits, in the course of which he makes good his threat and cleans up the whole place. Spaghetti flies through the air. Plump runs away with the cashier and poor Runt, trying to quell the disturbance, is finally buried under volley after volley of the stringy mixture.

== Cast ==
- Oliver Hardy - Plump (as Babe Hardy)
- Billy Ruge - Runt
- Ray Godfrey - Cashier
- Bert Tracy - Waiter
- Harry Burns - Chef
- Joe Cohen - Customer

== See also ==
- List of American films of 1916
