= All for a Girl (1916 film) =

1916 film

- Directed by: Will Louis
- Produced by: Louis Burstein
- Starring: Oliver Hardy
- Release date: April 20, 1916
- Country: United States
- Language: Silent with English intertitles

All for a Girl is a 1916 American silent comedy film featuring Oliver Hardy.

== Plot ==
Plump (Oliver Hardy) and Runt (Billy Ruge) are both interested in the same girl, Elsie. She agrees to marry the suitor who obtains the better job opportunity.

== Cast ==
- Oliver Hardy as Plump (as Babe Hardy)
- Billy Ruge as Runt
- Elsie MacLeod as Elsie

== See also ==
- List of American films of 1916
