= Curtis McHenry =

American actor (1899–1934)

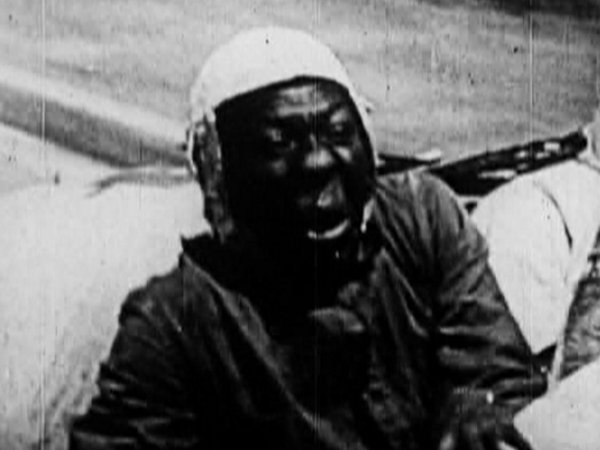
- Born: April 4, 1899; Ruston, Louisiana, U.S.
- Died: July 24, 1934 (aged 35); Los Angeles, California, U.S.
- Other names: G. Howe Black
- Occupation: Actor

Curtis 'Snowball' McHenry (April 4, 1899 – July 24, 1934) was an American stuntman and comedian who appeared in Larry Semon comedies in the 1920s. He was sometimes billed as G. Howe Black.

== Early life ==
According to his World War I draft card, McHenry was born in Ruston, Louisiana, on April 4, 1899. However, his death certificate said he was born on "April 4, 1900".

== Career ==
He started in films in 1920, after working in circuses and became known as 'Snowball'. He specialised in comedy at movie studios Chadwick Pictures and Christie Film Company.

He appeared in several Larry Semon films like Lightning Love (1923) and The Perfect Clown (1925). While his best known role is Snowball in Semon's The Wizard of Oz (1925). His character is a farmhand who travels to Oz with Dorothy and others, spending the latter part of the film dressed as a Cowardly Lion. In the movie he is credited as G. Howe Black; in a mainly positive review, a Variety critic admonished Semon for crediting McHenry with the demeaning name writing that McHenry, "deserved [a] better fate".

He is often confused with Spencer Bell (another popular black comedian of the era); with Bell being wrongly identified as appearing in The Wizard of Oz, among other films.

== Filmography ==
- The Counter Jumper (1922)
- The Banyard (1923)
- The Gown Shop (1923)
- Lightning Love (1923)
- Horseshoes (1923)
- No Wedding Bells (1923)
- Her Boyfriend (1924)
- Don't Park There (1924)
- Kid Speed (1924)
- Pocahontas and John Smith (1924)
- Robinson Crusoe (1924)
- The Four Wheeled Terror (1924)
- Dome Doctor (1925)
- The Cloudhopper (1925)
- The Wizard of Oz (1925) as G. Howe Black
- The Blue Blood (1925) as G. Howe Black
- The Perfect Clown (1925) as G. Howe Black
- The Prince of Broadway (1926) as G. Howe Black
- Stop, Look and Listen (1926)
- The Lyin' Tamer (1926)
- The Great K & A Train Robbery (1926)
- Isle of Sunken Gold (1927)
- Goofy Ghosts (1928)
- Barnum & Ringling, Inc. (1928)
- The Last Frontier (1932)
