= School Days (1920 film) =

1920 silent film

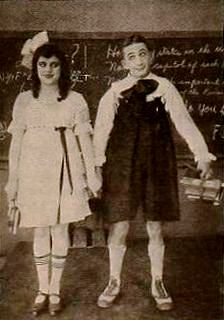
- Still from the American comedy short film School Days (1920) with Larry Semon and Lucille Carlisle, on page 3869 of the May 1, 1920 Motion Picture News.
- Production company: Vitagraph Company of America
- Release date: 1920
- Country: United States
- Language: English

School Days (sometimes spelled Schooldays) is a 1920 American silent comedy film, produced by the Vitagraph Company of America.

== Plot ==
Joe is a schoolboy, in school together with a girl (not named in the film) who is in love with him. She passes him a note on a slate stating "I love you Joe" while the grumpy and angry teacher is busy scolding one of the other children. Joe draws a heart on the slate to show his affection for the girl and shows her his drawing. He then later transforms the heart into a caricature of the teacher, to the amusement of the girl. When the teacher discovers the drawing, Joe gets into trouble and tells him off until another schoolboy, aiming for another boy in the class, hits the teacher with the wet sponge he had used to erase the blackboard with. Yet another schoolboy takes the opportunity while the teacher is dazed to dip his chewing gum in ink and fire it towards Joe with a slingshot. The gum hits Joe in the face and he chases after the boy, which gets the school's principle involved. More chaos ensues and things are complicated further when four inspectors arrive at the school, and accidentally sit down on sharpened objects (placed on the chairs by a schoolboy but meant for some of the girls).

The film then cuts to 10 years later, where the girl has grown up, her father Jed has married the school teacher and Joe and one of the boys from the school are employed on Jed's farm. Both Joe and his former school mate are in love with the girl and flirt with her. However, Jed has promised his girl's hand in marriage to his old friend Zeke's son Harold. Harold shows up at the farm and gets engaged to the girl. Joe interrupts the wedding and runs away with the girl in a car they steal on the farm. The drive away together but have an accident with the car and tumble down a cliff. Joe then wakes up in his classroom, revealing that it was all a dream.

== Cast list ==
- Larry Semon as Joe
- Lucille Carlisle as the girl
- Frank Alexander
- Al Thompson
- Frank Hayes
- Pete Gordon
- William Hauber

== Reception ==
The Film Daily gave it a positive review in May 1920, writing among other things: "What makes this a satisfactory offering of its type is the fact that there are several novel bits and that it has been produced on a lavish scale", but also noting that "Some of the riotous material could be cut to advantage, but, generally, this will hold on its own."

== Preservation status ==
A print of the film exists.
