= Koenekamp =

Koenekamp is a surname. Notable people with the surname include:

- Fred J. Koenekamp (1922–2017), American cinematographer
- H. F. Koenekamp (1891–1992), American special effects artist and cinematographer, father of Fred
