= The Star Boarder =

The Star Boarder may refer to:

- The Star Boarder (1914 film), an American film directed by George Nichols and starring Charlie Chaplin
- The Star Boarder (1919 film), an American film directed by, and starring, Larry Semon
- The Star Boarder (1920 film), an American comedy short film directed by James D. Davis
