= Norma Nichols =

American actress

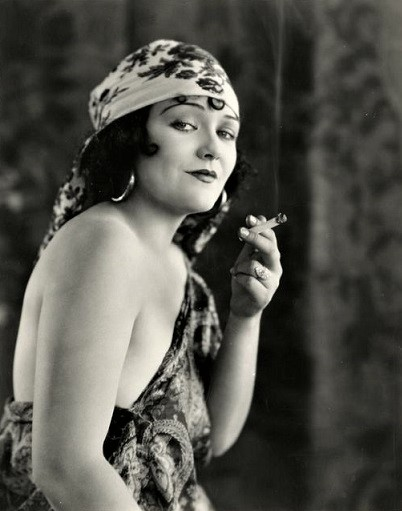
- Nichols in 1922
- Born: January 7, 1894; Santa Ana, California, U.S.
- Died: November 27, 1989 (aged 95); Los Angeles, California, U.S.
- Occupation: Actress
- Years active: 1914–1922
- Relatives: Marguerite Nichols (sister)

Norma Nichols (January 7, 1894 – November 27, 1989) was an American silent film actress. She appeared in 42 films between 1914 and 1922. She appeared in several of Larry Semon's films. She was the sister of actress Marguerite Nichols who married actor, director, and producer Hal Roach.

== Biography ==
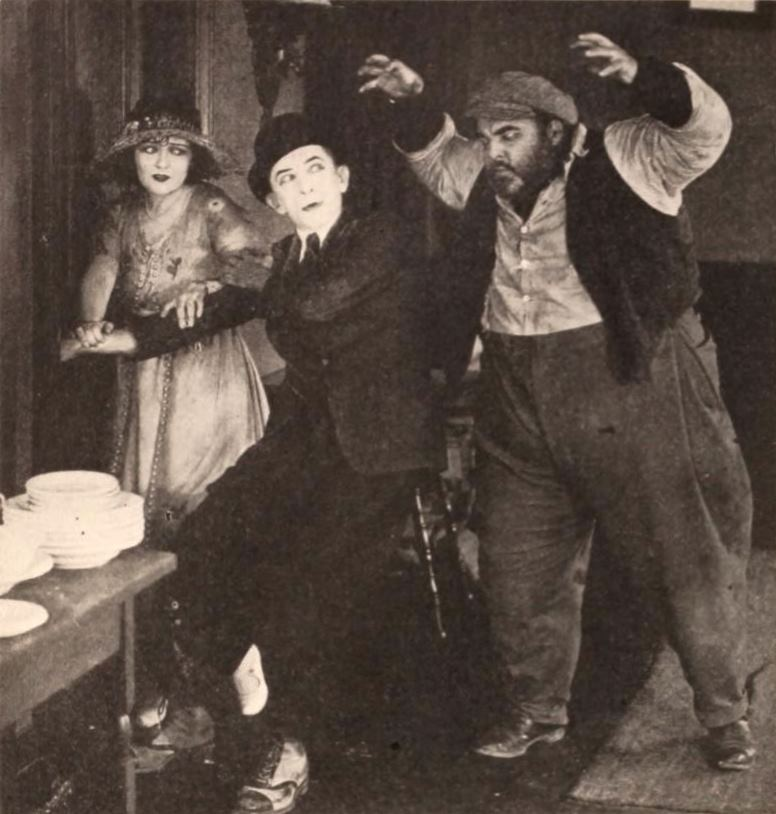
A still of Nichols performing with Larry Semon and Frank Alexander in The Rent Collector (1921)

Norma Nichols was born on January 7, 1894, in Santa Ana, California. She had major roles in films including The Ne'er-Do-Well (1916), Ham and the Hermit's Daughter (1916), and The Tides of Barnegat (1917). She died on November 27, 1989, in Los Angeles, California.

== Partial filmography ==
- Dough and Dynamite (1914)
- The Property Man (1914)
- Fatty's Jonah Day (1914)
- Fatty's Tintype Tangle (1915)
- The Ne'er-Do-Well (1916)
- Ham and the Hermit's Daughter (1916)
- The Tides of Barnegat (1917)
- The Legion of Death (1918)
- The Rent Collector (1921)
- The Bakery (1921)
- The Bell Hop (1921), extant
- The Fall Guy (1921)
- The Call of Home (1922)
