= The Grocery Clerk =

1919 film by Larry Semon

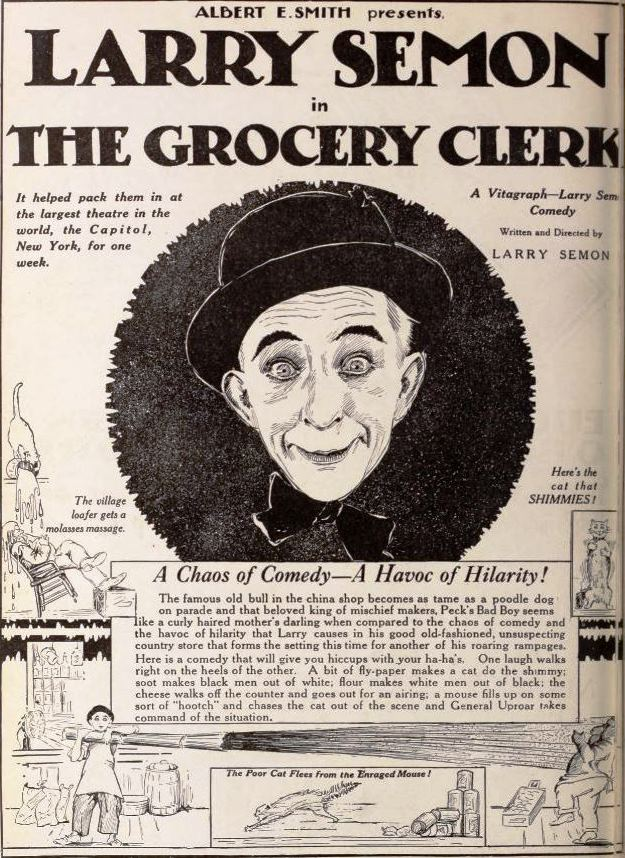
Advertisement

The Grocery Clerk is a 1919 American silent short comedy film directed by and starring Larry Semon, Lucille Carlisle, Monty Banks, Frank Hayes, Frank Alexander, Pete Gordon, and Jack Duffy. The film has been released as part of a collection on DVD.

== Cast ==
- Larry Semon as The Grocery Clerk
- Lucille Carlisle as The Postmistress
- Monty Banks as The Tow Gusher, a "He Vamp"
- Frank Hayes as Female Customer
- Frank Alexander as Big Ben
- Pete Gordon
- Jack Duffy as Old geezer / Hick
- Dorothy Vernon as Irate Customer (uncredited)
