= Huns and Hyphens =

1918 film

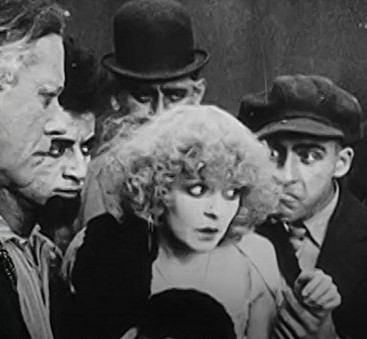
- Madge Kirby and Pete Gordon in Huns and Hyphens
- Directed by: Larry Semon
- Written by: Larry Semon
- Produced by: Albert E. Smith
- Starring: Larry Semon; Stan Laurel
- Distributed by: Vitagraph Company of America
- Release date: September 23, 1918
- Running time: 2 reels
- Country: United States
- Language: Silent (English intertitles)

Huns and Hyphens is a 1918 American silent comedy film featuring Larry Semon and Stan Laurel.

== Cast ==
- Larry Semon as Larry
- Madge Kirby as Vera Bright
- Stan Laurel as Gang member
- Mae Laurel as Woman
- William McCall as Customer (credited as Billy McCall)
- Frank Alexander as Cafe owner (credited as Fatty Alexander)
- William Hauber as Waiter (credited as Bill Hauber)
- Pete Gordon as Waiter
- C.L. Sherwood as German Agent (uncredited)
- John Rand as Unhappy Customer (uncredited)

== Reception ==
Like many American films of the time, Huns and Hyphens was subject to cuts by city and state film censorship boards. For example, the Chicago Board of Censors required a cut, in Reel 1, of the episode of squirting seltzer water at a man's trousers and the actions following.

== See also ==
- List of American films of 1918
