= That's My Line (film) =

1931 film

- Directed by: Fatty Arbuckle (as William Goodrich)
- Written by: Fatty Arbuckle (as William Goodrich)
- Produced by: Lew Lipton
- Starring: Louis John Bartels
- Edited by: Fred Maguire
- Release date: July 13, 1931
- Running time: 20 minutes
- Country: United States
- Language: English

That's My Line is a 1931 American Pre-Code comedy film directed by Fatty Arbuckle and starring Louis John Bartels, Paul Hurst, Gino Corrado, Al Thompson and Glen Cavender. In the plot, a lingerie salesman (Bartels) is seduced by a woman; Mexican bandits chase the salesman.

== Cast ==
- Louis John Bartels
- Paul Hurst
- Doris McMahon
- Gino Corrado
- Bert Young
- Al Thompson
- Glen Cavender
