= Frauds and Frenzies =

1918 film

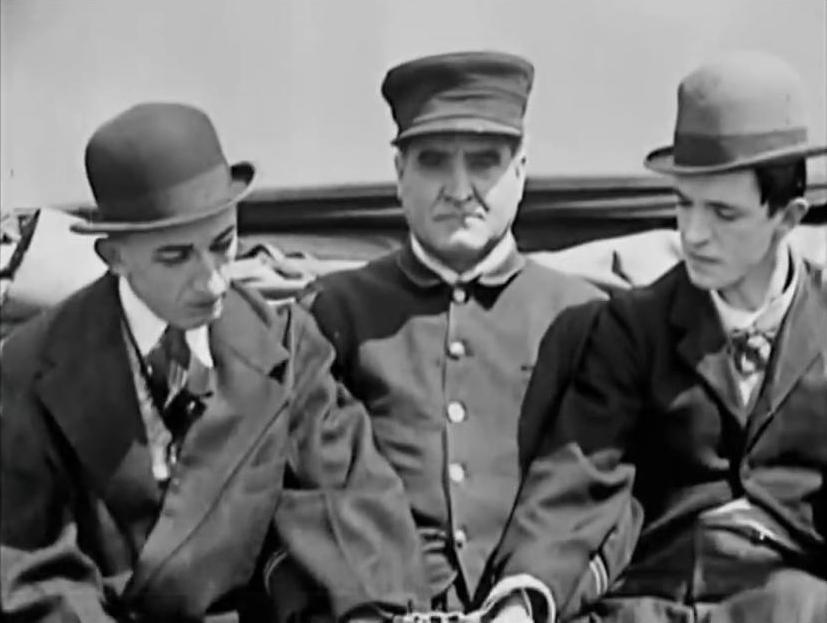
- (L to R) Larry Semon, William McCall, and Stan Laurel in Frauds and Frenzies
- Directed by: Larry Semon
- Written by: C. Graham Baker; Larry Semon
- Produced by: Albert E. Smith
- Starring: Larry Semon; Stan Laurel
- Release date: November 18, 1918
- Running time: 21 minutes
- Country: United States
- Languages: Silent film English intertitles

Frauds and Frenzies is a 1918 American silent comedy film featuring Stan Laurel.

== Cast ==
- Larry Semon as Larry, First Prisoner
- Stan Laurel as Simp, Second Prisoner
- Madge Kirby as Dolly Dare
- William McCall as Warden (as Billy McCall)
- William Hauber as Prison guard (as Bill Hauber)

== See also ==
- List of American films of 1918
