= Al Thompson =

American actor (1884–1960)

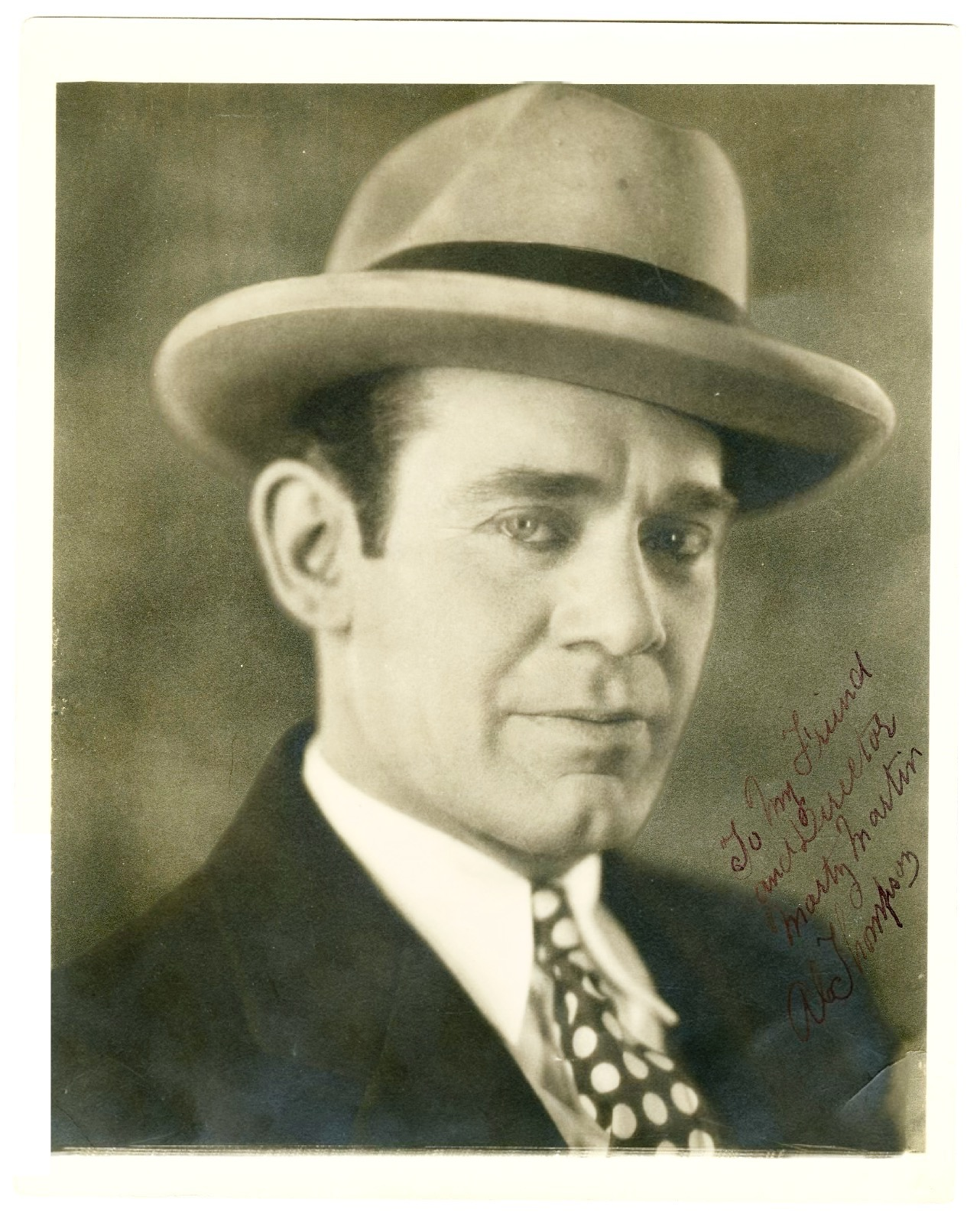
- Al Thompson Inscribed Photo
- Born: September 21, 1884; Philadelphia, Pennsylvania, U.S.
- Died: March 1, 1960 (aged 75); Los Angeles, California, U.S.
- Occupations: Actor, stunt double
- Years active: 1916–1958

Al Thompson (September 21, 1884 – March 1, 1960) was an American film actor. He appeared in more than 170 films between 1916 and 1958.

Well known in the industry for performing the more difficult stunts, he kept busy as a stunt double for Andy Clyde in the latter's many movies and also appeared in many Three Stooges shorts. The wiry, athletic Thompson performed in a variety of bit parts and was equally comfortable in roles as varied as laundry worker, professor, desk clerk, or sign painter.

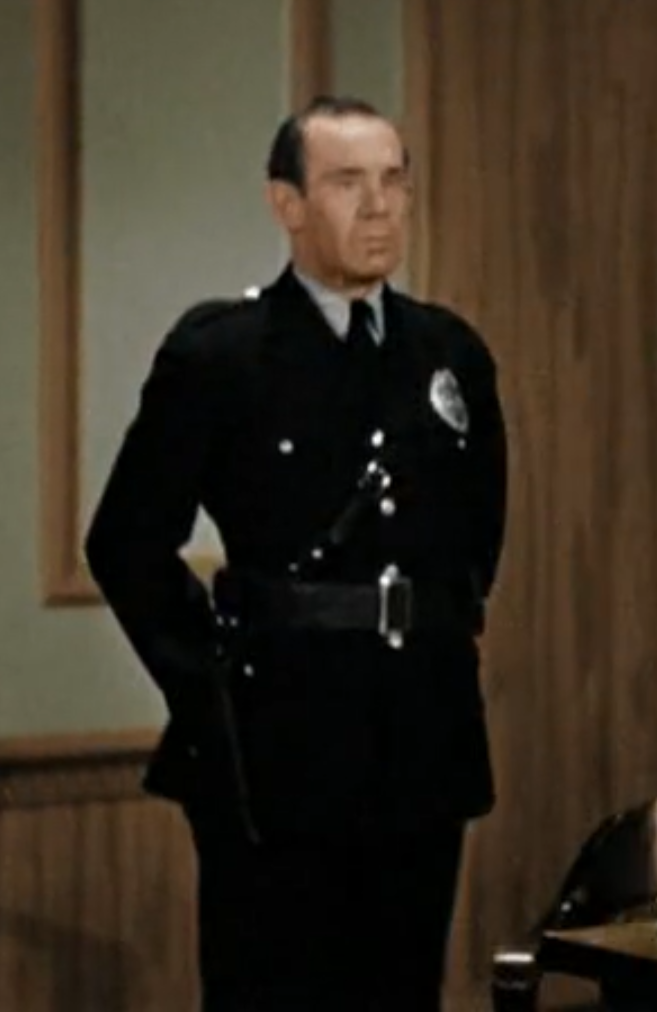
Thompson in Disorder in the Court (1936)

== Selected filmography ==
- Dull Care (1919, Short)
- The Stage Hand (1920, Short) - The Show Manager
- The Bakery (1921, Short) - Minor Role (uncredited)
- The Fall Guy (1921, Short)
- The Bell Hop (1921, Short)
- The Sawmill (1922, Short) - The boss
- The Show (1922, Short) - Man who Smuggles Family In
- Golf (1922, Short) - The father
- The Agent (1922, Short)
- The Counter Jumper (1922, Short) - Minor Role (uncredited)
- The Barnyard (1923, Short)
- The Midnight Cabaret (1923, Short)
- Lightning Love (1923, Short) - Father
- Trouble Brewing (1924, Short)
- Racing Luck (1924) - Member of Tony's gang
- The Better 'Ole (1926) - The Daughter in the Skit (uncredited)
- Listen Lena (1927, Short)
- The Missing Link (1927) - Sailor (uncredited)
- At It Again (1928) - Man (uncredited)
- The Flying Fool (1929) - Mechanic (uncredited)
- That's My Line (1931, Short) - Henchman
- Beach Pajamas (1931, Short)
- Westward Passage (1932) - Chauffeur (uncredited)
- Sons of the Desert (1933) - Son of the Desert (uncredited)
- The Gold Ghost (1934, Short) - Miner (uncredited)
- Manhattan Melodrama (1934) - Street Spectator (uncredited)
- Sons of Steel (1934) - Carson
- Restless Knights (1935, Short) - Henchman (uncredited)
- Pop Goes the Easel (1935, Short) - Man in Car (uncredited)
- Circumstantial Evidence (1935) - Mosher (uncredited)
- Roaring Roads (1935) - Parkins
- Adventurous Knights (1935) - Parkins - the Butler
- Pardon My Scotch (1935, Short) - Jones (uncredited)
- The Big Broadcast of 1936 (1935) - Servant (uncredited)
- Oh, My Nerves (1935, Short)
- The Lady in Scarlet (1935) - Mr. Quigley (uncredited)
- False Pretenses (1935) - Avery - Restaurant Manager (uncredited)
- Just My Luck (1935) - Worker in Montage (uncredited)
- Ants in the Pantry (1936, Short) - Guest with moustache & glasses (uncredited)
- Under Two Flags (1936) - Chasseur Soldier (uncredited)
- Disorder in the Court (1936, Short) - Bailiff (uncredited)
- Below the Deadline (1936) - Sparring Partner Al
- Missing Girls (1936) - Joey
- Whoops, I'm an Indian! (1936, Short) - Deputy Sheriff (uncredited)
- Ditto (1937, Short) - Man in stable
- Dizzy Doctors (1937, Short) - Second Surgeon (uncredited)
- 3 Dumb Clucks (1937, Short) - Pop's Butler (uncredited)
- Bank Alarm (1937) - Auto Camp Manager (uncredited)
- Tarzan's Revenge (1938) - Sign Painter (uncredited)
- The Great Adventures of Wild Bill Hickok (1938, Serial) - Townsman (uncredited)
- Violent Is the Word for Curly (1938, Short) - Professor Frankfurter (uncredited)
- Prison Break (1938) - Party Waiter (uncredited)
- Block-Heads (1938) - Sidewalk Fight Participant (uncredited)
- Flat Foot Stooges (1938, Short) - Volunteer (uncredited)
- Three Little Sew and Sews (1939, Short) - Party Guest (uncredited)
- Zenobia (1939) - Townsman at Zeke's Recitation (uncredited)
- Lucky Night (1939) - Bum (uncredited)
- Saved by the Belle (1939, Short) - Wagon Driver (uncredited)
- Little Accident (1939) - Laundry Worker (uncredited)
- Heroes in Blue (1939) - Man at Race Track (uncredited)
- A Chump at Oxford (1939) - Manhole Worker (uncredited)
- The Shadow (1940, Serial) - Henchman [Chs. 2, 10, 15] (uncredited)
- You Nazty Spy! (1940, Short) - Axis Minister (uncredited)
- Young Tom Edison (1940) - Man at Station (uncredited)
- Saps at Sea (1940) - (uncredited)
- Sandy Is a Lady (1940) - Craneman (uncredited)
- From Nurse to Worse (1940, Short) - Orderly (uncredited)
- King of the Royal Mounted (1940, Serial) - Paralytic #4 [Ch.4] (uncredited)
- The Monster and the Girl (1941) - Juryman (uncredited)
- I'll Never Heil Again (1941, Short) - Heilstone's Servant (uncredited)
- Texas (1941) - Doc (uncredited)
- In the Sweet Pie and Pie (1941, Short) - Prison Warden (uncredited)
- Holt of the Secret Service (1941, Serial) - Gambler (uncredited)
- Freckles Comes Home (1942) - Dance Floor Extra (uncredited)
- Loco Boy Makes Good (1942, Short) - Dancing Partner (uncredited)
- Ride 'Em Cowboy (1942) - Napping Station Agent (uncredited)
- The Forest Rangers (1942) - Lumberjack (uncredited)
- Matri-Phony (1942, Short)
- The Desperadoes (1943) - Townsman Shown Paper Money (uncredited)
- Back From the Front (1943, Short) - German Officer / German Sailor (uncredited)
- Three Little Twirps (1943, Short) - Ticket Window Clerk (uncredited)
- I Can Hardly Wait (1943, Short) - Patient (uncredited)
- Top Man (1943) - Guard (uncredited)
- Dizzy Pilots (1943, Short) - Sky Aircraft Co. Representative (uncredited)
- Hi'ya, Sailor (1943) - Hotel Clerk (uncredited)
- A Gem of a Jam (1943, Short) - Policeman (uncredited)
- Her Primitive Man (1944) - Explorer (uncredited)
- The Yoke's on Me (1944, Short) - Sheriff (uncredited)
- In Society (1944) - Minor Role (uncredited)
- Cry of the Werewolf (1944) - Sheep Rancher (uncredited)
- The Soul of a Monster (1944) - Disabled Warehouseman (uncredited)
- The Merry Monahans (1944) - Tramp (uncredited)
- Carolina Blues (1944) - Telegram Messenger (uncredited)
- Both Barrels Blazing (1945) - Poker-Playing Henchman (uncredited)
- Idiots Deluxe (1945, Short) - Courtroom Spectator (uncredited)
- If a Body Meets a Body (1945, Short) - Uncle Bob O. Link (uncredited)
- Beer Barrel Polecats (1946, Short) - Al - Police Photographer (uncredited)
- The Harvey Girls (1946) - Townsman at Dance (uncredited)
- The Hoodlum Saint (1946) - Mug (uncredited)
- The Runaround (1946) - Sign Painter (uncredited)
- Our Hearts Were Growing Up (1946) - Minor Role (uncredited)
- G.I. Wanna Home (1946, Short) - Motorist (uncredited)
- Three Little Pirates (1946, Short) - Pirate (uncredited)
- Half-Wits Holiday (1947, Short) - Mr. Toms (uncredited)
- Blondie's Anniversary (1947) - Acme Loan Company Owner (uncredited)
- All Gummed Up (1947, Short) - Pen Customer (uncredited)
- The Wreck of the Hesperus (1948) - York (uncredited)
- My Dog Rusty (1948) - Townsman (uncredited)
- Fury at Furnace Creek (1948) - Waiter (uncredited)
- Fiddlers Three (1948, Short) - King's Attendant (uncredited)
- Best Man Wins (1948) - Creditor (uncredited)
- The Street with No Name (1948) - Hotel Clerk (uncredited)
- Borrowed Trouble (1948) - Barfly (uncredited)
- Black Eagle (1948) - Townsman (uncredited)
- Rusty Leads the Way (1948) - Gas Station Attendant (uncredited)
- Words and Music (1948) - Waiter (uncredited)
- Ladies of the Chorus (1948) - Mae's Fan (uncredited)
- Riders of the Whistling Pines (1949) - Townsman at Hearing (uncredited)
- The Younger Brothers (1949) - Deputy (uncredited)
- The Doolins of Oklahoma (1949) - Coffeyville Citizen Outside Bank (uncredited)
- Blondie Hits the Jackpot (1949) - Delivery Man (uncredited)
- That Midnight Kiss (1949) - Truck Driver (uncredited)
- All the King's Men (1949) - Man in Cheap Bar (uncredited)
- Father Is a Bachelor (1950) - Court Clerk (uncredited)
- Kill the Umpire (1950) - Minor Role (uncredited)
- The Tougher They Come (1950) - Tom
- Mrs. O'Malley and Mr. Malone (1950) - Janitor (uncredited)
- Snake River Desperadoes (1951) - Townsman (uncredited)
- Rich, Young and Pretty (1951) - French Reporter (uncredited)
- The Stooge (1951) - Audience Member (uncredited)
- Belles on Their Toes (1952) - Porter (uncredited)
- We're Not Married! (1952) - Minister (uncredited)
- Lure of the Wilderness (1952) - Shep Rigby (uncredited)
- The Caddy (1953) - Mr. Phillips - Man on Ladder (uncredited)
- A Star Is Born (1954) - Vagrant #1 (uncredited)
- Gypped in the Penthouse (1955, Short) - Club Guest (uncredited)
- Bring Your Smile Along (1955) - Burlesque Audience Member (uncredited)
- Blunder Boys (1955, Short) - Hotel Clerk (uncredited)
- Scheming Schemers (1956, Short) - Party Guest (uncredited)
- The Phantom Stagecoach (1957) - Murphy (uncredited)
- The Three Faces of Eve (1957) - Man at Funeral (uncredited)
- Visit to a Small Planet (1960) - Drunk (uncredited)
