= Lucille Carlisle =

American actress

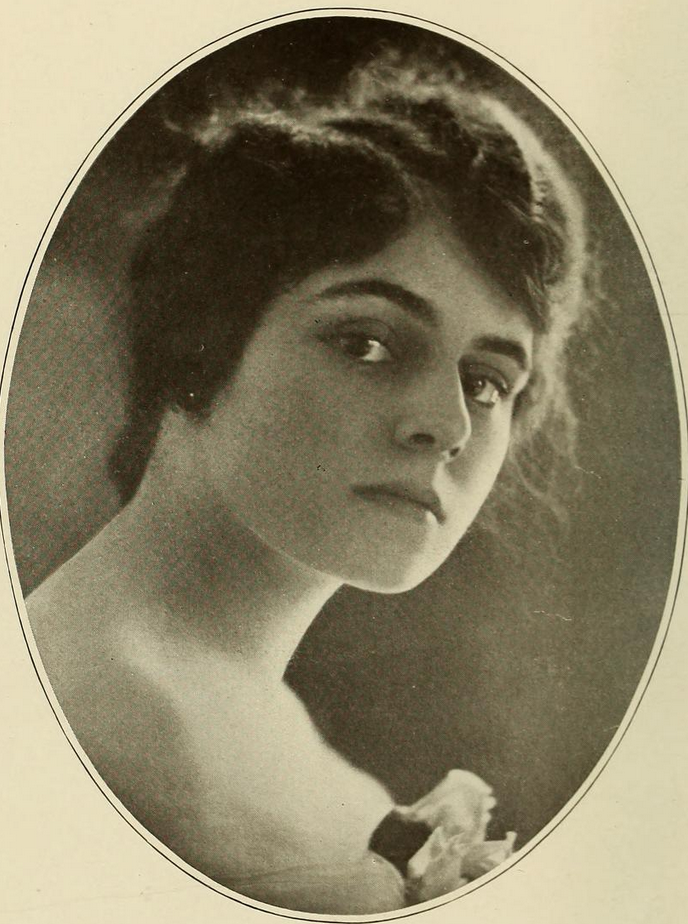
- Lucille Zintheo (later Carlisle), from a 1916 publication
- Born: Ida Lucile White; August 31, 1895; Galesburg, Illinois
- Died: October 19, 1958 (aged 63); Los Angeles, California
- Other names: Lucille Zintheo, Lucille Ida Millikin
- Occupation: Actress

Lucille Carlisle (August 31, 1895 – October 19, 1958), born Ida Lucile White, was an American actress.

== Early life ==
Ida Lucile White was born in Galesburg, Illinois, the daughter of Frank White and Della Pope White. Her family was of Irish and French descent. In childhood, she moved to Spokane, Washington, with her family.

== Career ==
After winning a beauty contest sponsored by Photoplay magazine, and a brief career on stage, Carlisle began making silent films for Vitagraph Studios, with comedian and director Larry Semon. Together they made 25 films. After their professional and personal relationship ended, she also left film work. She was heard on radio in the 1930s and 1940s, representing Mothers of America, an anti-war organization.

== Personal life ==
Lucille White married Elder J. Zintheo briefly in 1912; their divorce became final in 1916. Carlisle and Larry Semon were a couple on and off from 1918 to 1923. In 1924, her experiences with rhinoplasty were described in front-page headlines. In 1927 she married a Canadian businessman, Leigh Hacking Millikin. She died in 1958, aged 63 years, in Los Angeles. Her gravesite is at Forest Lawn Cemetery in Glendale, California.

== Filmography ==
Year	Title	Role	Notes
1918	Boodle and Bandits	Sheriff	(as Lucille Zintheo)
1918	Pluck and Plotters	Bit Role	(uncredited)
1919	Scamps and Scandals	Wedding Guest	(as Lucille Zintheo)
1919	Well, I'll Be	Susie	(as Lucille Zintheo)
1919	Passing the Buck	The Fat Crook's Wife	(as Lucille Zintheo)
1919	The Star Boarder	The Warden's Daughter	
1919	His Home Sweet Home	The Wife	
1919	The Simple Life	Captain Tillie	
1919	Between the Acts	Manager's Wife	
1919	Dull Care	Chief of Police's Wife	
1919	Dew Drop Inn	The Girl	
1919	The Head Waiter	Cashier	(as Lucille Zintheo)
1919	The Grocery Clerk	The Postmistress	
1920	The Fly Cop	A Cabaret Queen	
1920	Solid Concrete	The Boss' Daughter	
1920	The Stage Hand	The Leading Lady	
1920	The Suitor	An Heiress	
1920	School Days		
1921	The Sportsman	The Tourist's Daughter	
1922	The Show	Leading Lady	
1922	A Pair of Kings	Princess Lucille	
1922	Golf	The Blonde Flapper	
1922	The Agent	Undercover Federal Agent	
1922	The Counter Jumper	Glorietta Hope	
1923	No Wedding Bells	The Girl	Final film role
