= The Girl in the Limousine =

1924 film

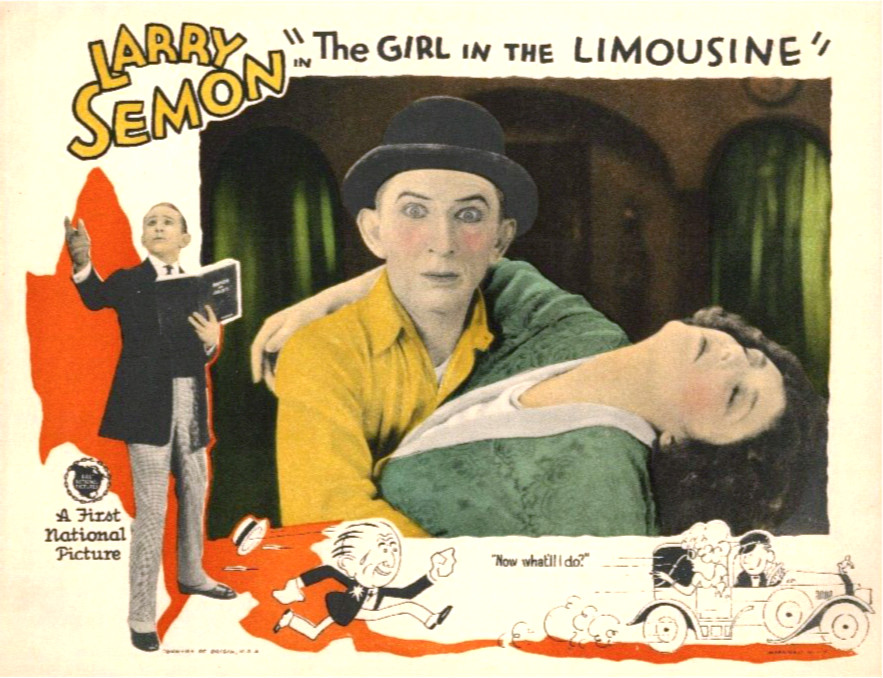
- Lobby card
- Directed by: Larry Semon; Noel M. Smith
- Written by: C. Graham Baker
- Based on: The Girl in the Limousine by Wilson Collison and Avery Hopwood
- Produced by: Leon Lee; Larry Semon
- Starring: Larry Semon; Oliver Hardy
- Cinematography: Hans F. Koenekamp
- Distributed by: First National Pictures
- Release date: July 20, 1924
- Running time: 6 reels
- Country: United States
- Language: Silent (English intertitles)

The Girl in the Limousine is a 1924 American comedy film starring Larry Semon and featuring Oliver Hardy. The film is based on the 1919 play of the same name by Wilson Collison and Avery Hopwood.

== Cast ==
- Larry Semon as Tony
- Claire Adams as The Girl
- Charles Murray as The Butler
- Lucille Ward as Aunt Cicily
- Larry Steers as Dr. Jimmy
- Oliver Hardy as Freddie
- Florence Gilbert as Bernice
- Charles Sellon as Undetermined Secondary Role

== Preservation ==
With no prints of The Girl in the Limousine located in any film archives, it is a lost film.

== See also ==
- List of American films of 1924
- Oliver Hardy filmography
- List of lost films
