= Golf (film) =

1922 film

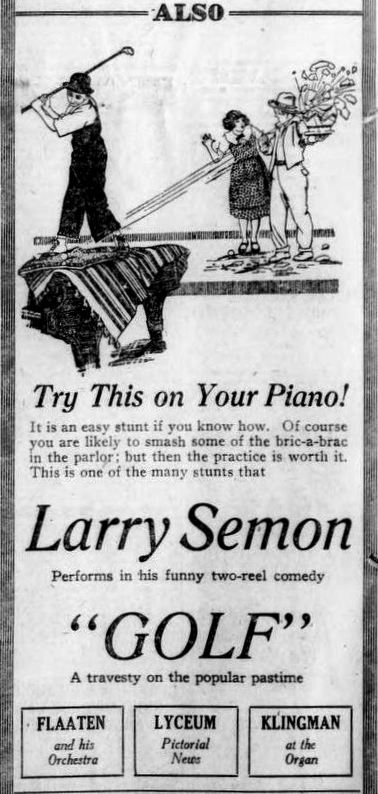
- Newspaper ad
- Directed by: Tom Buckingham; Larry Semon
- Written by: Tom Buckingham; Larry Semon
- Produced by: Larry Semon
- Starring: Larry Semon; Oliver Hardy
- Cinematography: Reginald Lyons
- Distributed by: Vitagraph Company of America
- Release date: September 3, 1922
- Country: United States
- Language: Silent (English intertitles)

Golf is a 1922 American silent comedy film starring Larry Semon and featuring Oliver Hardy. The film has been released on DVD.

== Plot ==
Using a drill to make holes in his floor, a golfer (Larry Semon) refuses to stop playing, swinging clubs from a tabletop, smashing mirrors and pottery throughout the house, even knocking golf balls into the soup bowl of a neighbor (Oliver Hardy).

== Cast ==
- Larry Semon as The son
- Lucille Carlisle as The daughter, the Blonde Flapper
- Al Thompson as The father
- Oliver Hardy as The neighbor (as Babe Hardy)
- Vernon Dent as The suitor
- William Hauber as Mr. Dub
- Eva Thatcher as Mrs. Dub
- Fred Lancaster as Golfer
- Joe Rock as Golfer (as Joe Basil)
- Pete Gordon as Golfer

== See also ==
- List of American films of 1922
