= The Stage Hand =

1920 film

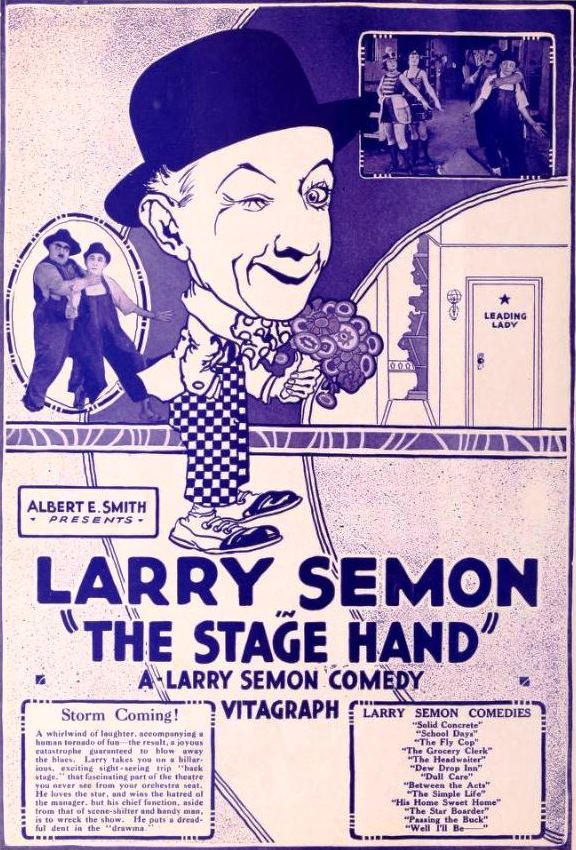
- Advertisement
- Directed by: Larry Semon; Norman Taurog
- Written by: Larry Semon; Norman Taurog
- Produced by: Larry Semon; Albert E. Smith
- Starring: Larry Semon
- Cinematography: Hans F. Koenekamp
- Distributed by: Vitagraph Company of America
- Release date: September 20, 1920
- Running time: 2 reels
- Country: United States
- Language: Silent (English intertitles)

The Stage Hand is a 1920 American silent short comedy film featuring Oliver Hardy.

== Plot ==
This summary of the plot was published in The Moving Picture World for August 28, 1920:

The materials of slam-bang farce are limited, and its activities are so great that repetition is 'not to be avoided. The wonder is that ingenuity can keep on playing variations on the ridiculous month after month without exhausting itself. Larry Semon is an industrious farce-maker and relies heavily on mechanical accessories and pantomime. The most original feature of “The Stage Hand” is the role played by a highly trained monkey . Mr. Monk never makes a slip in performing a part little short of human in the intelligence with which it appears to be played. Interest, in fact, centers on his amazing antics — he is the real star in provoking laughter.

== Cast ==
- Larry Semon as The Stage Hand
- Lucille Carlisle as The Leading Lady
- Frank Alexander as The Stage Manager
- Thelma Percy as The Animal Trainer
- Al Thompson as The Show Manager
- William Hauber as Props
- Jack Duffy as The Hero
- Frank Hayes as The Prima Donna
- Oliver Hardy as Audience member (uncredited)

== See also ==
- List of American films of 1920
