= William Hauber =

American actor

- Born: William Carl Hauber; May 20, 1891; Brownsville, Minnesota, US
- Died: July 17, 1929 (aged 38); Reseda, California, US
- Other name: Bill Hauber
- Occupations: Film actor, stunt performer
- Years active: 1913–1928
- Spouse: Myrtle Crosswaite (m. 1914)
- Children: 1

William Carl Hauber (May 20, 1891 – July 17, 1929) was an American silent film actor and much-in-demand stunt performer, known as one of the original Keystone Cops, and for his decade-long association with comic actor Larry Semon, both as a supporting player and as the star's frequent stunt double. He appeared in more than 60 films between 1913 and 1928.

== Early life and career ==
Born and raised in Brownsville, Minnesota, Hauber was one of six children born to German-American parents, Florian Hauber and Katherine Breiner.

1n 1916, Hauber was featured alongside his fellow Keystone alumnus, Anna Luther, in the Fox Film short, Her Father's Station.

In November 1919, The Motion Picture News reported that, in a soon-to-be-released Larry Semon film, Hauber and an athletic troupe dubbed the Mazetta Brothers were—with the aid of a rock crusher "in the vicinity of" Monrovia, California—"do[ing] the best work of their film careers in the matter of jumps and falls."

Hauber's final credited screen appearance came in 1928, as Quint in the early talkie, The Midnight Taxi, amidst an "all-star cast" headed by Antonio Moreno and Helene Costello, and featuring, among others, Myrna Loy, William Russell, and Tommy Dugan.

== Personal life and death ==
From April 28, 1914 until his death, Hauber was married to Myrtle Crosthwaite (older sister of Keystone actress/diver Ivy Crosthwaite), with whom he had one child, a son, William Carl Hauber Jr.

On July 17, 1929, Hauber, while scouting locations for an aerial stunt to be performed the following day for the film, The Aviator, died in an airplane crash when the pilot, cinematographer Alvin Knechtel, suddenly lost consciousness, and the plane crashed, nose down, in a barley field near Reseda, California, approximately two miles from Metropolitan Airport in Van Nuys. Hauber was survived by his wife and son. He is buried in Forest Lawn in Glendale, California.

Roughly eight decades later, Hauber was dubbed by film historian Brent Walker "probably the greatest stuntman ever to work at Keystone—and perhaps the greatest in all silent comedy.".

== Selected filmography ==
- That Ragtime Band (1913)
- Barney Oldfield's Race for a Life (1913)
- Fatty's Flirtation (1913)
- A Flirt's Mistake (1914)
- Mabel at the Wheel (1914)
- Tillie's Punctured Romance (1914)
- Love, Loot and Crash (1915)
- His Bitter Pill (1916)
- Huns and Hyphens (1918)
- Bears and Bad Men (1918)
- Frauds and Frenzies (1918)
- Dull Care (1919)
- The Stage Hand (1920)
- The Bakery (1921)
- The Rent Collector (1921)
- The Fall Guy (1921)
- The Bell Hop (1921)
- The Sawmill (1922)
- The Show (1922)
- A Pair of Kings (1922)
- Golf (1922)
- The Agent (1922)
- The Counter Jumper (1922)
- The Barnyard (1923)
- The Midnight Cabaret (1923)
- The Gown Shop (1923)
- Lightning Love (1923)
- Trouble Brewing (1924)
- Her Boy Friend (1924)
- Kid Speed (1924)
- The Midnight Taxi (1928)
