= The Simple Life (1919 film) =

- Directed by: Larry Semon
- Written by: Larry Semon
- Produced by: Vitagraph Company of America; Albert E. Smith
- Starring: Larry Semon
- Distributed by: Vitagraph Company
- Release date: August 4, 1919
- Running time: 2 reels
- Country: USA
- Language: Silent (English intertitles)

The Simple Life is a 1919 silent film comedy short directed by and starring Larry Semon. It was produced and distributed by the Vitagraph Company of America.

== Cast ==
- Larry Semon - A Farmer's Boy
- Lucille Carlisle - Captain Tillie
- Frank Alexander - A Farmer
- Frank Hayes - A Police Officer
