= Trouble Brewing (1924 film) =

1924 film

- Directed by: James D. Davis; Larry Semon
- Written by: James D. Davis; Larry Semon
- Starring: Larry Semon; Carmelita Geraghty; Oliver Hardy
- Production company: Larry Semon Productions
- Distributed by: Vitagraph Studios
- Release date: March 12, 1924
- Country: United States
- Language: Silent with English intertitles

Trouble Brewing is a 1924 American silent comedy film featuring Larry Semon, Carmelita Geraghty and Oliver Hardy. A print of the film exists.

== Cast ==
- Larry Semon as Government agent
- Carmelita Geraghty as The Girl
- Oliver Hardy as Bootlegger (as Babe Hardy)
- William Hauber
- Al Thompson

== See also ==
- List of American films of 1924
- List of lost films
