= The Head Waiter =

1919 film

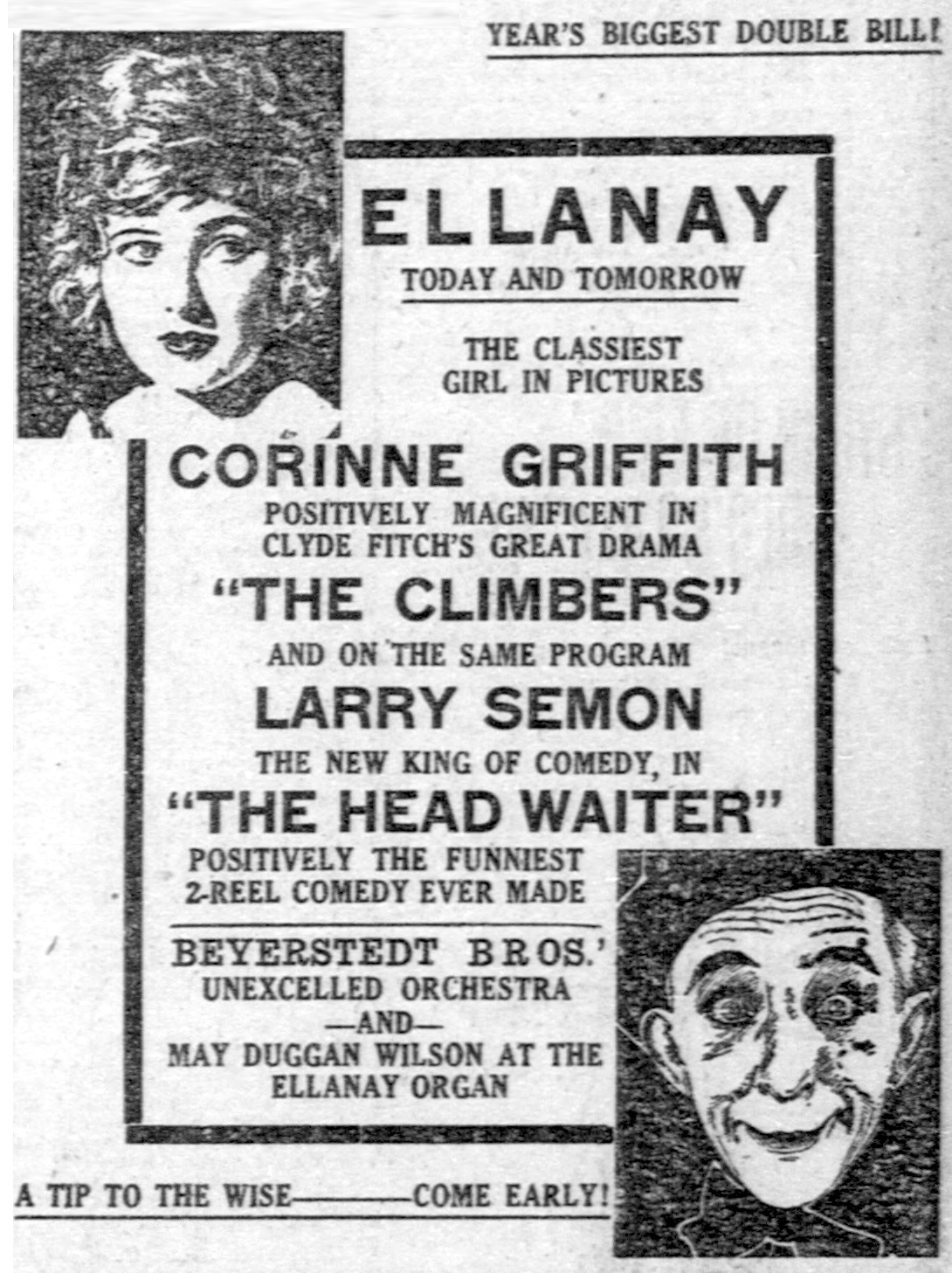
- A contemporary newspaper advertisement, featuring The Head Waiter as a double feature with The Climbers, another film from 1919.
- Directed by: Larry Semon
- Written by: Larry Semon
- Produced by: Albert E. Smith
- Starring: Oliver Hardy
- Release date: December 1, 1919
- Country: United States
- Language: Silent (English intertitles)

The Head Waiter is a 1919 American silent comedy film featuring Larry Semon in the titular role. The film also features Oliver Hardy.

== Cast ==
- Larry Semon as The Head Waiter
- Oliver Hardy as A Cop (credited as Babe Hardy)
- Lucille Carlisle as Cashier (credited as Lucille Zintheo)

== See also ==
- List of American films of 1919
- Oliver Hardy filmography
