= The Agent (1922 film) =

1922 film

- Directed by: Tom Buckingham; Larry Semon
- Written by: Tom Buckingham; Larry Semon
- Produced by: Larry Semon
- Starring: Oliver Hardy
- Cinematography: Hans F. Koenekamp
- Distributed by: Vitagraph Company of America
- Release date: November 19, 1922
- Running time: 2 reels
- Country: United States
- Language: Silent (English intertitles)

The Agent is a 1922 American silent comedy film featuring Oliver Hardy.

== Cast ==
- Larry Semon as Federal Agent
- Lucille Carlisle as Federal Agent, Undercover
- Oliver Hardy as Don Fusiloil (credited as Babe Hardy)
- Al Thompson
- Kittie Rinehart
- William Hauber
- Robert McKenzie
- Harry DeRoy
- Alfred Wertz
- Dan Maines
- Joe Rock as Bit Role (uncredited)

== See also ==
- List of American films of 1922
