= The Sawmill =

1922 film

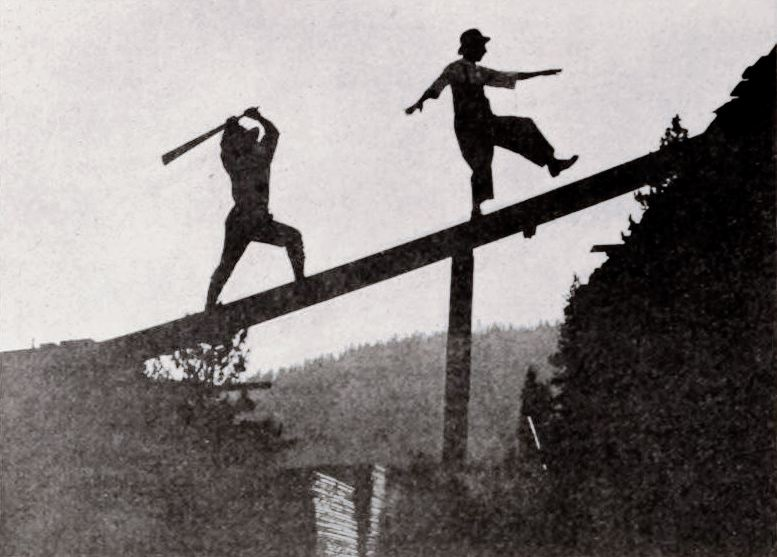
- Film still
- Directed by: Larry Semon; Norman Taurog
- Written by: Larry Semon; Norman Taurog
- Produced by: Larry Semon; Albert E. Smith
- Starring: Oliver Hardy
- Cinematography: Hans F. Koenekamp
- Distributed by: Vitagraph Company of America
- Release date: January 1, 1922
- Running time: 25 minutes
- Country: United States
- Language: Silent (English intertitles)

The Sawmill is a 1922 American silent comedy short film directed by Larry Semon and featuring Oliver Hardy. The Sawmill was shot at Hume Lake.

== Cast ==
- Larry Semon as The dumb-bell
- Oliver Hardy as The foreman (credited as Babe Hardy)
- Frank Alexander as mill owner
- Ann Hastings as mill owner's daughter
- Al Thompson as the boss
- Kathleen O'Connor as the boss's daughter
- Rosa Gore
- William Hauber
- Peter Ormonds
- Pal the Dog

== See also ==
- List of American films of 1922
- Oliver Hardy filmography
