= The Bakery (film) =

1921 film

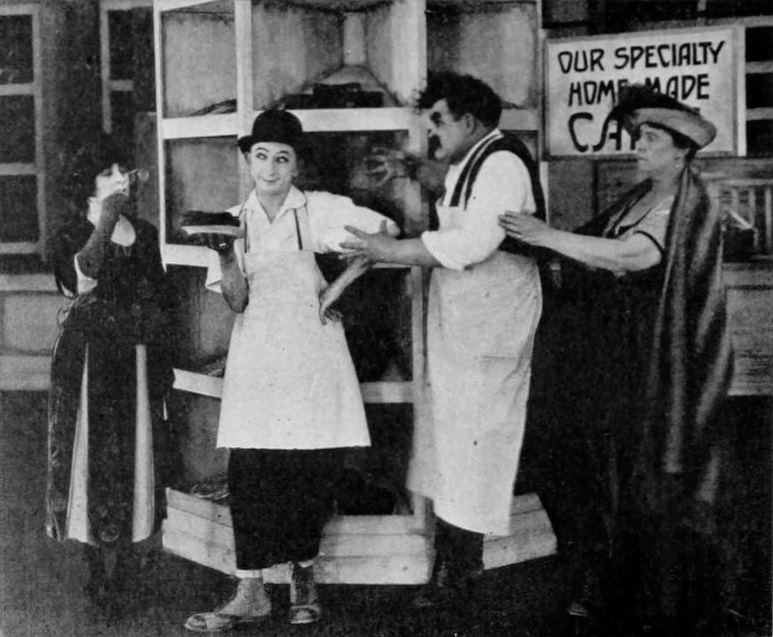
- Film still
- Directed by: Larry Semon; Norman Taurog
- Written by: Larry Semon; Norman Taurog
- Produced by: Larry Semon; Albert E. Smith
- Starring: Oliver Hardy
- Distributed by: Vitagraph Company of America
- Release date: June 20, 1921
- Running time: 2 reels
- Country: United States
- Language: Silent (English intertitles)

The Bakery (1921)

The Bakery is a 1921 American short comedy film featuring Oliver Hardy that was directed by Larry Semon and Norman Taurog.

== Cast ==
- Larry Semon as Larry, a Bakery Clerk
- Oliver Hardy as Foreman (credited as Babe Hardy)
- Frank Alexander as Bakery Owner
- Norma Nichols as Bakery Owner's Daughter
- William Hauber as Rival worker (credited as Bill Hauber)
- Grover Ligon as Bakery worker
- Eva Thatcher as Customer
- Pete Gordon as Bakery worker
- Al Thompson as Bakery Worker
- Jack Duffy as Elderly Shop Owner (uncredited)

== See also ==
- List of American films of 1921
