= The Midnight Cabaret =

1923 film

- Lobby card
- Directed by: Larry Semon
- Written by: Larry Semon
- Produced by: Larry Semon
- Starring: Oliver Hardy
- Release date: May 1923
- Country: United States
- Language: Silent with English intertitles

The Midnight Cabaret is a 1923 American film directed by Larry Semon and featuring Oliver Hardy.

== Cast ==
- Larry Semon as Larry, a Waiter
- Kathleen Myers as Kathleen, a Cabaret Performer
- Oliver Hardy as Oliver, an Impetuous Suitor (as Babe Hardy)
- Fred DeSilva
- William Hauber
- Al Thompson
- Joe Rock

== See also ==
- List of American films of 1923
- Oliver Hardy filmography
