= The Barnyard =

1923 film

- Directed by: Larry Semon
- Written by: Larry Semon
- Produced by: Larry Semon
- Starring: Oliver Hardy
- Release date: March 1923
- Country: United States
- Language: Silent with English intertitles

The Barnyard is a 1923 American film featuring Oliver Hardy and directed by Larry Semon.

== Plot ==
Lay Zee is a farmer who works at agriculture, food and crops in the Arizonian town. The people tell the story about what starts in the farm. The next morning, Lay wakes up with a pig, then feeds the animal until the egg drops on his head. He suddenly gotten out of bed and then threw the shoe towards the rooster then glass falls on the other farmer's head when he's sleeping. They get up to escape in the barn to find out how Farm Hand is going to do. Lay lifts up the treasure chest wherever a small horse is found inside of it. Next, they drag each other to keep pulling the kettle towards the hay. Farm Hand and The Farmer's Wife start a big fight to have a solution to what's going on. He starts falling on the cow as the rodeo, which will let him get through to meet his farm girls. The airplane comes around to where the farmers are inviting. After gathering other animals on the play, the duckling is used as for brief stop-motion effects, controlling on the other animals. When the mule comes out of the hay, Farm Hand and The Farmer's Daughter discuss this animal apparently. The farmers gather out and clean the roof and wash themselves. Lay heads out back behind the fence until he got covered in mud. Afterwards, the farmers relieved Lay to what he was doing. The farmers lived happily as they could ever be in Arizona.

== Cast ==
- Larry Semon - Lay Zee, Farm Hand
- Kathleen Myers - The Farmer's Daughter
- Oliver Hardy - Farm Hand (as Babe Hardy)
- Frank Hayes - The Farmer's Wife
- Spencer Bell - Helper
- William Hauber
- Al Thompson
- Joe Rock

== See also ==
- List of American films of 1923
- Oliver Hardy filmography
