= The Rent Collector =

1921 film

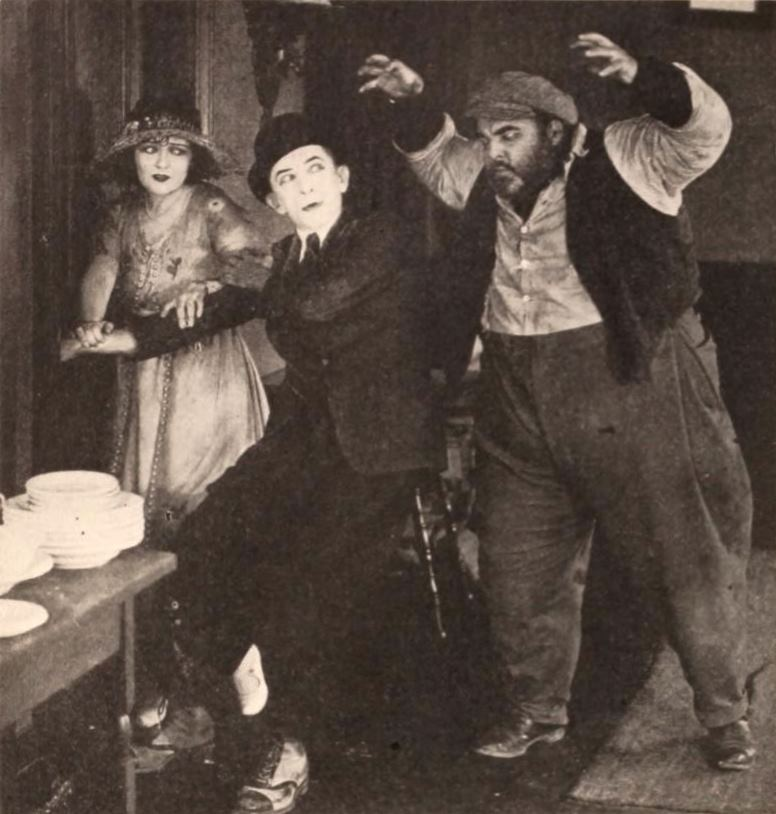
- Still of Norma Nichols, Larry Semon, and Frank Alexander from the film
- Directed by: Larry Semon; Norman Taurog
- Written by: Larry Semon; Norman Taurog
- Produced by: Larry Semon; Albert E. Smith
- Starring: Larry Semon, Oliver Hardy
- Production company: Larry Semon Productions
- Distributed by: Vitagraph Company of America
- Release date: May 23, 1921
- Running time: 2 reels
- Country: United States
- Language: Silent (English intertitles)

The Rent Collector is a 1921 American silent comedy film directed by Larry Semon and Norman Taurog. It featured Semon and Oliver Hardy. It was produced by Larry Semon's production company and distributed by the Vitagraph Company of America.

== Plot ==
The Rent Collector (1921)

== Cast ==
- Larry Semon as Larry, the Rent Collector
- Norma Nichols as Leader of the Society Girl Settlement Workers
- Oliver Hardy as The Big Boss (credited as Babe Hardy)
- Eva Thatcher as Landlady
- Frank Alexander as A thug
- Pete Gordon as Barber
- William Hauber as Bit Role (uncredited)
- Leo Willis as Bit Role (uncredited)

== See also ==
- List of American films of 1921
- Oliver Hardy filmography
