= The Perfect Clown =

1925 film

- Video cover
- Directed by: Fred C. Newmeyer
- Written by: Thomas J. Crizer; Charlie Saxton
- Starring: Larry Semon; Kate Price
- Cinematography: George Baker; Nicholas T. Barrows
- Distributed by: Chadwick Pictures
- Release date: December 15, 1925
- Running time: 55 minutes
- Country: United States
- Language: Silent (English intertitles)

The Perfect Clown is a 1925 American silent slapstick comedy film starring Larry Semon and Kate Price. It features an early screen appearance by Oliver Hardy. Directed by Fred C. Newmeyer, the screenplay was written by Thomas J. Crizer, who also wrote the subtitles along with Charlie Saxton.

== Plot ==
The story is about a clerk who is given $10,000 to deposit at the bank, but the bank is closed for the night so he tries to get to the bank president's house with the money.

== Cast ==
The film

- Larry Semon as Bert Larry
- Kate Price as Mrs. Sally Mulligan
- Dorothy Dwan as Rosie
- Joan Meredith as Her Chum
- Otis Harlan as The Boss
- Curtis McHenry as Snowball (credited as G. Howe Black)
- Oliver Hardy as Babe Mulligan
- Frank Alexander as Tiny Tott
- Sam Allen (uncredited)
- Paul Fix as Bellhop (uncredited)
- Alice Fletcher (uncredited)
- Stuart Holmes (uncredited)
- Tiny Sandford as Cop (uncredited)

== Preservation ==
Prints of The Perfect Clown are held in the collections of the Cineteca Italiana (Milan), Museum of Modern Art (New York City), UCLA Film and Television Archive (Los Angeles), and Academy Film Archive (Beverly Hills).

== See also ==
- List of American films of 1925
