= Stop, Look and Listen (film) =

1926 film

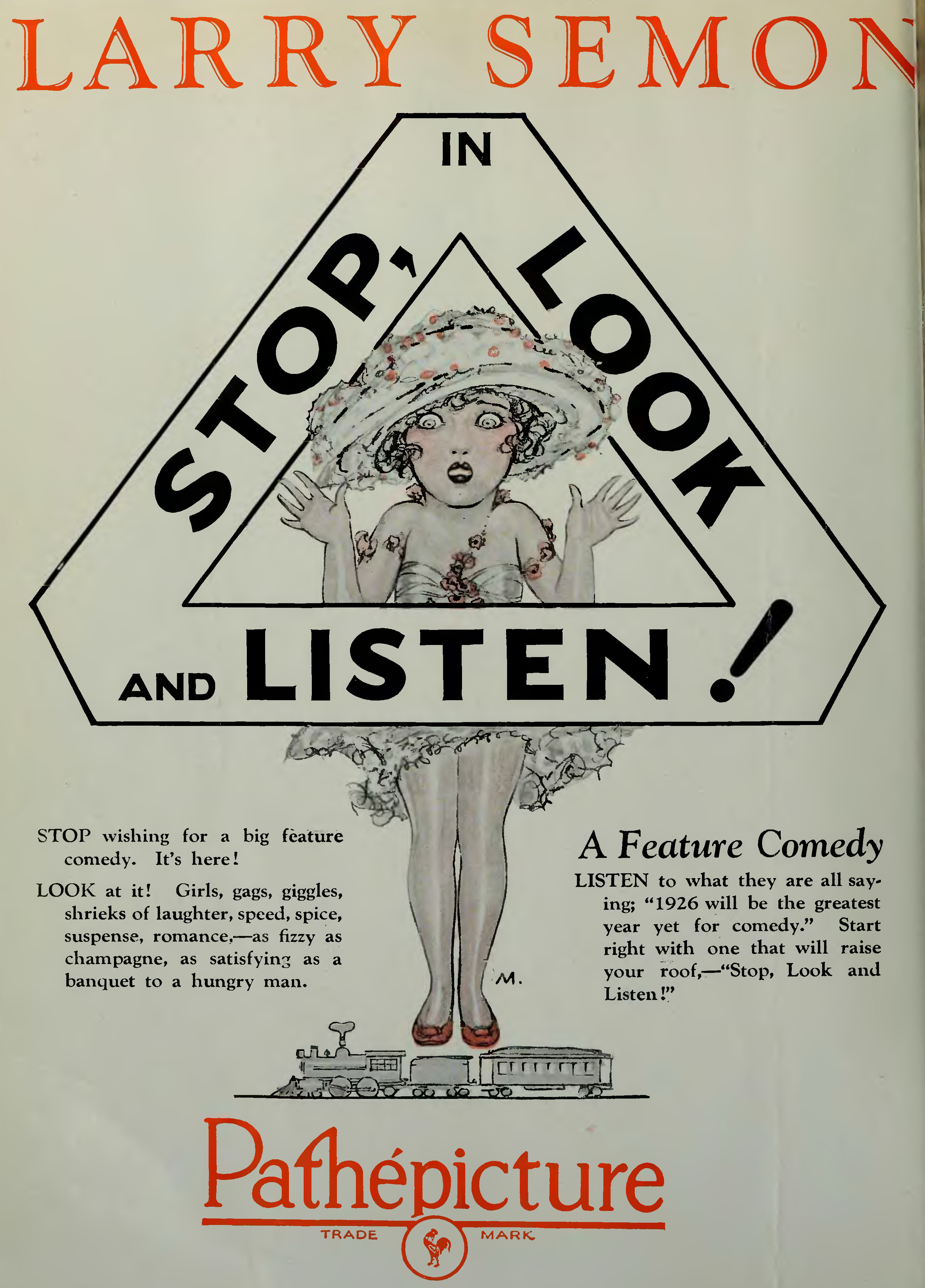
- Film magazine advertisement
- Directed by: Larry Semon
- Written by: Larry Semon
- Based on: Stop, Look and Listen; 1915 musical by Irving Berlin; Harry B. Smith
- Produced by: Larry Semon
- Starring: Oliver Hardy
- Cinematography: James S. Brown Jr. Hans F. Koenekamp
- Production company: Larry Semon Productions
- Distributed by: Pathé Exchange
- Release date: January 1, 1926
- Running time: 6 reels
- Country: United States
- Language: Silent (English intertitles)

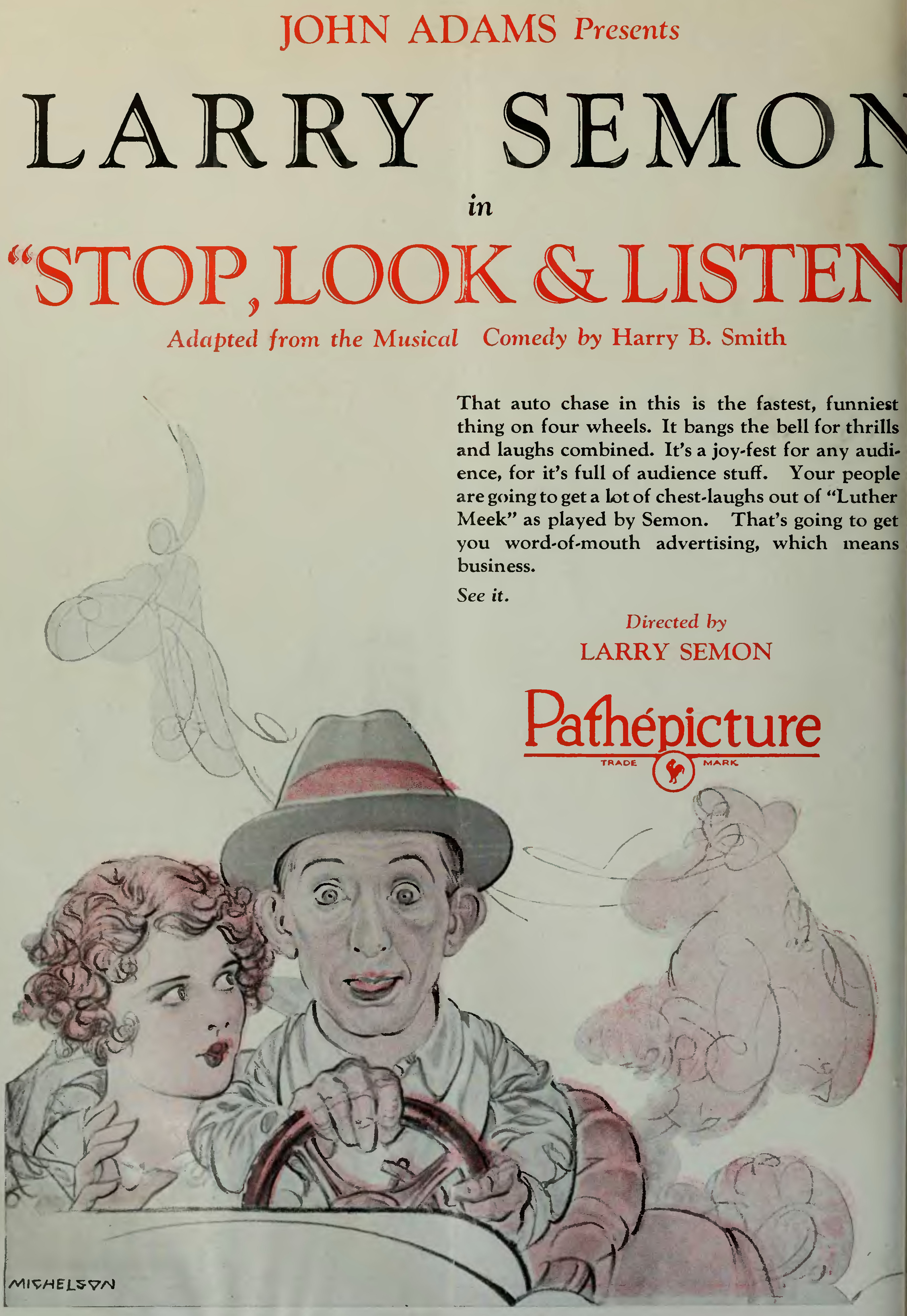
Ad in The Film Daily, 1926

Stop, Look and Listen is a 1926 American silent comedy film starring Larry Semon and Dorothy Dwan and featuring Oliver Hardy. Semon and Dwan were married at the time. This was Hardy's final film appearance with Semon.

== Plot ==
As described in a film magazine review, Luther Meek is a well-behaved young citizen of a small town with a sweetheart named Dorothy who pines for footlight fame. She coaxes him into backing a traveling show in which she is starred. On the opening night of the show, while the stage-struck Dorothy gets muddled in her initial appearance, the Stage Manager and Dorothy's graceless stepbrother rob a bank. Luther is blamed for the crime, but he escapes his pursuers and follows the thieves, finally catching the ringleader and recovering the money. Dorothy then decides to abandon her stage dreams and weds Luther.

== Cast ==
- Larry Semon as Luther Meek
- Dorothy Dwan as Dorothy
- Mary Carr as Mother
- William Gillespie as Bill
- Lionel Belmore as Sheriff
- B.F. Blinn as The Mayor
- Bull Montana as Strong Man
- Oliver Hardy as Show Manager (credited as Babe Hardy)
- Curtis 'Snowball' McHenry as Porter (credited as Curtis McHenry)
- Josef Swickard as Old Actor

== Production ==
Stop, Look and Listen was the first film by Semon's production company and was based upon the successful 1915 musical comedy play of the same name by Irving Berlin and Harry B. Smith. The film, however, was not a financial success for Pathé Exchange.

The African-American actor and stuntman Curtis McHenry is featured during the motorcycle and sidecar chase sequence. Oliver Hardy, who co-directed, also performs a difficult high and hard fall on to train tracks at the finale.

== Preservation ==
The majority of the film was considered to be lost. In early 2020, it was announced that approximately 10 minutes of footage exists. The last reel of the film was found by a Japanese film researcher, Toshihiko Sasayama, who bought it off an antiques dealer. A 43-minute reunited version, including the climactic motorcycle and train chase, was exhibited by Matsuda Film Productions in Tokyo in January 2024 with a live benshi commentary and piano accompaniment.

== See also ==
- List of American films of 1926
- List of rediscovered films
