= Bears and Bad Men =

1918 film

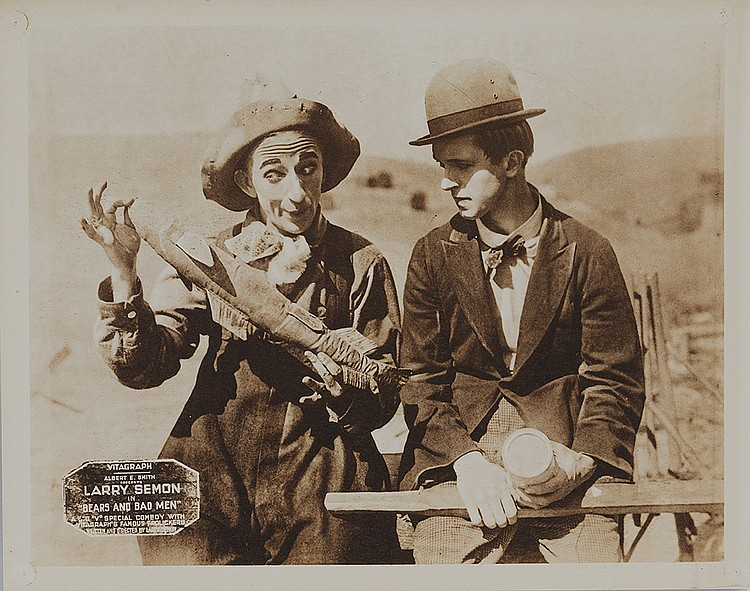
- Larry Semon (left) and Stan Laurel in Bears and Bad Men
- Directed by: Larry Semon
- Written by: Larry Semon
- Produced by: Albert E. Smith
- Starring: Stan Laurel
- Distributed by: Vitagraph Company of America
- Release date: October 7, 1918
- Running time: Approximately 20 minutes (2 reels)
- Country: United States
- Language: Silent (English intertitles)

The full film

Bears and Bad Men is a 1918 American silent comedy film directed by Larry Semon and featuring Stan Laurel.

== Cast ==
- Larry Semon as Larry Cutshaw
- Madge Kirby as The Slawson Daughter
- Stan Laurel as Pete
- William McCall as Stranded actor (credited as Billy McCall)
- Blanche Payson as Maw Cutshaw
- Frank Alexander as Paw Slawson
- William Hauber
- Pete Gordon as Paw Cutshaw
- Mae Laurel as Scared Woman
- Bessie the Bear
- Brownie the Bear

== Reception ==
Like many American films of the time, Bears and Bad Men was subject to cuts by city and state film censorship boards. For example, the Chicago Board of Censors required a cut, in Reel 1, of a scene with a man looking at a goat and putting it off of his lap after water is seen pouring from a bucket.

== See also ==
- List of American films of 1918
