= The Show (1922 film) =

1922 film

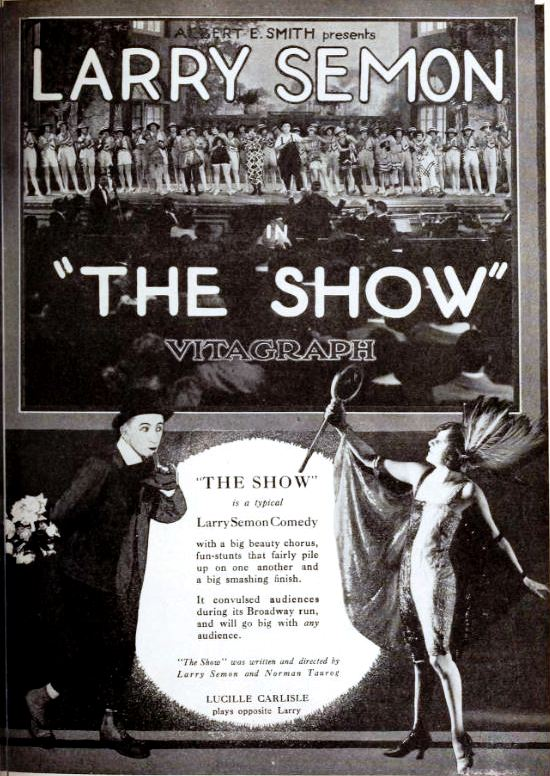
- Advertisement
- Directed by: Larry Semon; Norman Taurog
- Written by: Larry Semon; Norman Taurog
- Produced by: Larry Semon; Albert E. Smith
- Starring: Oliver Hardy
- Cinematography: Hans F. Koenekamp
- Distributed by: Vitagraph Company of America
- Release date: March 19, 1922
- Running time: 20 minutes
- Country: United States
- Language: Silent (English intertitles)

The Show is a 1922 American silent short comedy film directed by Larry Semon and Norman Taurog and featuring Oliver Hardy.

== Plot ==
The Show (1922)

As described in a film magazine, Larry Semon is a stage hand and is also part of the audience, which keeps one guessing regarding the dual capacity. He steals a bouquet of flowers meant for the star and gives them to a member of the chorus, not knowing that a cat has knocked over a bottle of ink on them. He then turns on the wind machine at the wrong time, filling the stage and playhouse with black powder. He attempts to save the star's jewels but is knocked senseless, and dreams of a wild ride to recover them. Then he wakes up.

== Cast ==
- Larry Semon as The Prop Man / Gentle Onlooker
- Oliver Hardy as Stage manager / Audience Member (credited as Babe Hardy)
- Frank Alexander as Ballet dancer
- Lucille Carlisle as Leading lady
- Betty Young as Dancer
- Alice Davenport as Audience member
- Al Thompson as Man Who Smuggles His Family Into Show
- Frank J. Coleman as Audience member / Woman with Hat / Cop
- Jack Miller Jr. as Villain
- Grover Ligon as Bald Policeman
- William Hauber as Audience member (credited as Bill Hauber)
- Ernie Adams as Magician / Audience Member (uncredited)
- Madame Sul-Te-Wan as Maid (uncredited)
