= Spuds (film) =

1927 film

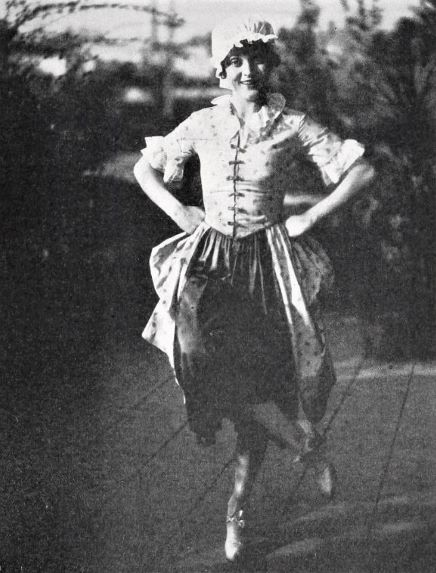
- Still with Dorothy Dwan
- Directed by: Edward Ludwig
- Written by: Edward Ludwig
- Produced by: Larry Semon
- Starring: Larry Semon; Dorothy Dwan; Edward Hearn
- Cinematography: James S. Brown Jr.; Hans F. Koenekamp
- Production company: Larry Semon Productions
- Distributed by: Pathé Exchange
- Release date: April 10, 1927
- Running time: 50 min.
- Country: United States
- Language: Silent (English intertitles)

Spuds is a 1927 American silent comedy film directed by Edward Ludwig and starring Larry Semon, Dorothy Dwan, and Edward Hearn. Semon and Dwan were married. The film survives and it's preserved.

== Synopsis ==
In France during World War I, an American doughboy attempts to recover a car carrying a payroll of two hundred and fifty thousand dollars that was stolen by German spies.

== Cast ==
- Larry Semon as Spuds
- Dorothy Dwan as Madelon
- Edward Hearn as Captain Arthur
- Kewpie Morgan as Sergeant
- Robert Graves as General
- Hazel Howell as Bertha
- Hugh Fay as Spy

== Reception ==
Spuds was not well received and Semon, who had largely financed the film on his own, lost all of his remaining money. Spuds was his last feature film, and he filed for bankruptcy in March 1928. He died of pneumonia and tuberculosis on October 8, 1928.

== Bibliography ==
- Munden, Kenneth White. The American Film Institute Catalog of Motion Pictures Produced in the United States, Part 1. University of California Press, 1997.
