= The Counter Jumper =

1922 film

- Directed by: Larry Semon
- Written by: Larry Semon
- Produced by: Larry Semon
- Starring: Oliver Hardy
- Cinematography: Reginald Lyons
- Edited by: A.A. Jordan; Larry Semon
- Release date: December 9, 1922
- Country: United States
- Languages: Silent film English intertitles

The Counter Jumper is a 1922 American film directed by Larry Semon and featuring Oliver Hardy. It is a remake of the 1919 film The Grocery Clerk, which was also directed by Semon. The film was screened at the Museum of Modern Art in 2009 as part of a series examining slapstick.

== Cast ==
- Larry Semon as Larry, the Counter Jumper
- Lucille Carlisle as Glorietta Hope
- Oliver Hardy as Gaston Gilligan (as Babe Hardy)
- Curtis McHenry as A Clerk
- Eva Thatcher
- Jack Duffy
- William McCall
- Reginald Lyons
- James Donnelly
- William Hauber as Bit Role (uncredited)
- Joe Rock as Bit Role (uncredited)
- Al Thompson as Bit Role (uncredited)

== See also ==
- List of American films of 1922
- Oliver Hardy filmography
