= The Great K & A Train Robbery =

1926 film

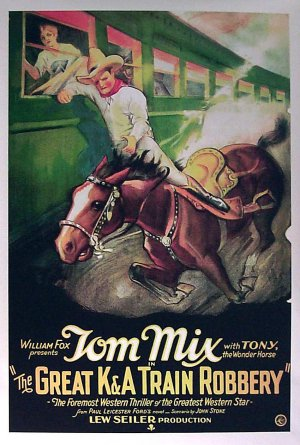
- Theatrical release poster
- Directed by: Lewis Seiler
- Screenplay by: John Stone
- Based on: The Great K & A Train Robbery; 1896 novel in Lippincott's Magazine by Paul Leicester Ford
- Produced by: Lewis Seiler; William Fox
- Starring: Tom Mix; Tony the Horse
- Cinematography: Daniel B. Clark
- Music by: William P. Perry (1977)
- Production company: Lew Seiler Productions
- Distributed by: Fox Film Corporation
- Release date: October 17, 1926
- Running time: 53 minutes
- Country: United States
- Languages: Silent film; English intertitles

The Great K & A Train Robbery is a 1926 American silent Western film directed by Lewis Seiler and starring Tom Mix and Dorothy Dwan. The film is based on the actual foiling of a train robbery by Dick Gordon as related by Paul Leicester Ford in his book The Great K & A Train Robbery originally published as a serial in Lippincott's Monthly Magazine in 1896.

== Plot ==
The Great K & A Train Robbery (1926)

Following a series of robberies of the K & A Railroad, detective Tom Gordon is hired to uncover the mystery. Disguised as a bandit, Tom boards the train of K & A President Cullen. Cullen's daughter, Madge, senses that Tom is not a criminal and soon falls in love with him. Madge is sought after by Burton, her father's secretary, who is in league with the bandits. Tom eventually discovers his duplicity, and with the aid of Tony, his horse, rounds up the villains and wins the hand of Madge.

== Cast ==
- Tom Mix as Tom Gordon
- Tony the Horse as Tony, Tom's Horse
- Dorothy Dwan as Madge Cullen
- Will Walling as Eugene Cullen
- Harry Gripp as DeLuxe Harry
- Carl Miller as Burton Holt
- Edward Peil Sr. as Bill Tolfree
- Curtis 'Snowball' McHenry as Snowball
- Sammy Cohen as Man in upper berth of train (uncredited)

Future Western film icon John Wayne worked as a property assistant (props boy) on the film and appeared as an extra.

== Film locations ==
Much of the film was shot on location in and around Glenwood Springs, Colorado. The film is notable for its use of breathtaking locations including shots along the Colorado River. Local residents gathered every day for three weeks to watch Mix and his famous horse, Tony, perform their own stunts. Many locals were used as extras. Mix brought the fifty-five cast and crew members, along with his family, to Colorado in two Pullman train cars along with two special baggage cars.

- Glenwood Springs, Colorado
- Royal Gorge, Colorado
- Shoshone Dam in Glenwood Canyon

== See also ==
- Tom Mix filmography
