= The Fall Guy (1921 film) =

1921 film

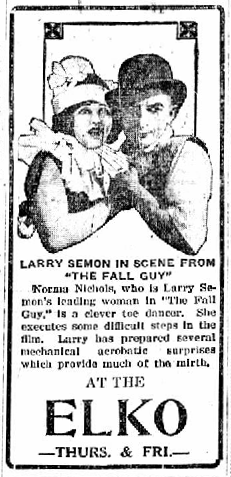
- Newspaper advertisement
- Directed by: Larry Semon; Norman Taurog
- Written by: Edward L. Moriarty; Larry Semon; Norman Taurog
- Produced by: Larry Semon; Albert E. Smith
- Starring: Oliver Hardy
- Cinematography: Hans F. Koenekamp
- Production company: Larry Semon Productions
- Distributed by: Vitagraph Company of America
- Release date: July 16, 1921
- Running time: 20 minutes
- Country: United States
- Language: Silent (English intertitles)

The Fall Guy is a 1921 American silent comedy film featuring Larry Semon and Oliver Hardy.

== Plot ==
From a November 1921 newspaper ad for the film: "A funny film of life as it might be. A fantasy of cowboys who saddle automobiles and bad men who get wild on ice cream cones. This is the first [Larry] Semon comedy we have been able to get for over two months and can't get another for a long time, so don't miss The Fall Guy. Said to be his best."

Black Bart is a successful highway robber in the Old West, and disguises himself as respectable citizen Gentleman Joe between thefts. The Sheriff is 300 pounds plus of gullibility and Bart is riding high. The drink of choice in the town saloon is ice cream rather than hard liquor---it can either be eaten;or thrown at the Sheriff. Bart has eyes for the unwilling Dance hall Girl(Norma Nichols). But visiting city slicker Larry is ready to ride to her rescue---if he ever manages to get his creaky jalopy out of a muddy ditch. When he does,the gas pedal jams and he crashes through the saloon wall. Ordered to get the car out of there, the car suddenly grows a "human face" and chases Larry all over town.

Larry eventually unmasks Bart's double identity.Bart takes off in his high-powered roadster.Larry can't find a car that doesn't fall apart as soon as he gets into it. Bart hides in a garage—and takes off;taking the garage with him. Larry gains the roof and harasses Bart t hrough a trap door. With his visibility cut off, Bart can't see himself going over a cliff. Larry grabs overhead telephone wires just in time. Bart looks around at the wreckage,disgustedly pulls down a loose window shade,and takes a nap. Larry wins the girl, but sinks into a deep puddle while running to meet her.

== Cast ==
- Larry Semon as Larry, the Fall Guy
- Norma Nichols as Prima Donna
- Oliver Hardy as Gentleman Joe, alias Black Bart (as Babe Hardy)
- Frank Alexander as Sheriff
- William Hauber
- Al Thompson

== See also ==
- List of American films of 1921
