= A Pair of Kings (film) =

1922 film

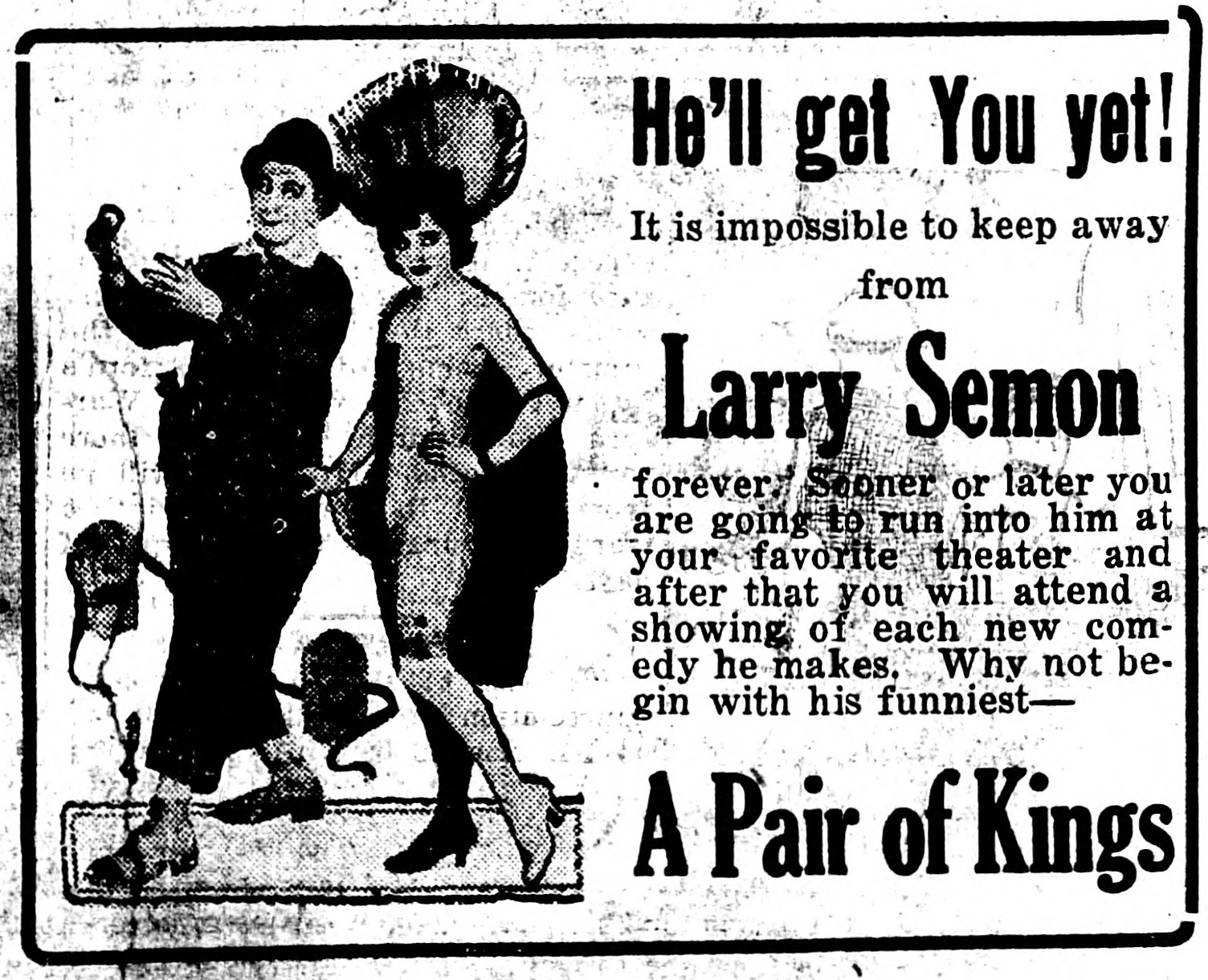
- Newspaper advertisement
- Directed by: Larry Semon; Norman Taurog
- Written by: Larry Semon; Norman Taurog
- Produced by: Larry Semon; Albert E. Smith
- Starring: Oliver Hardy
- Cinematography: Hans F. Koenekamp
- Distributed by: Vitagraph Company of America
- Release date: June 11, 1922
- Running time: 17 minutes
- Country: United States
- Language: Silent (English intertitles)

A Pair of Kings is a 1922 American silent comedy film featuring Oliver Hardy.

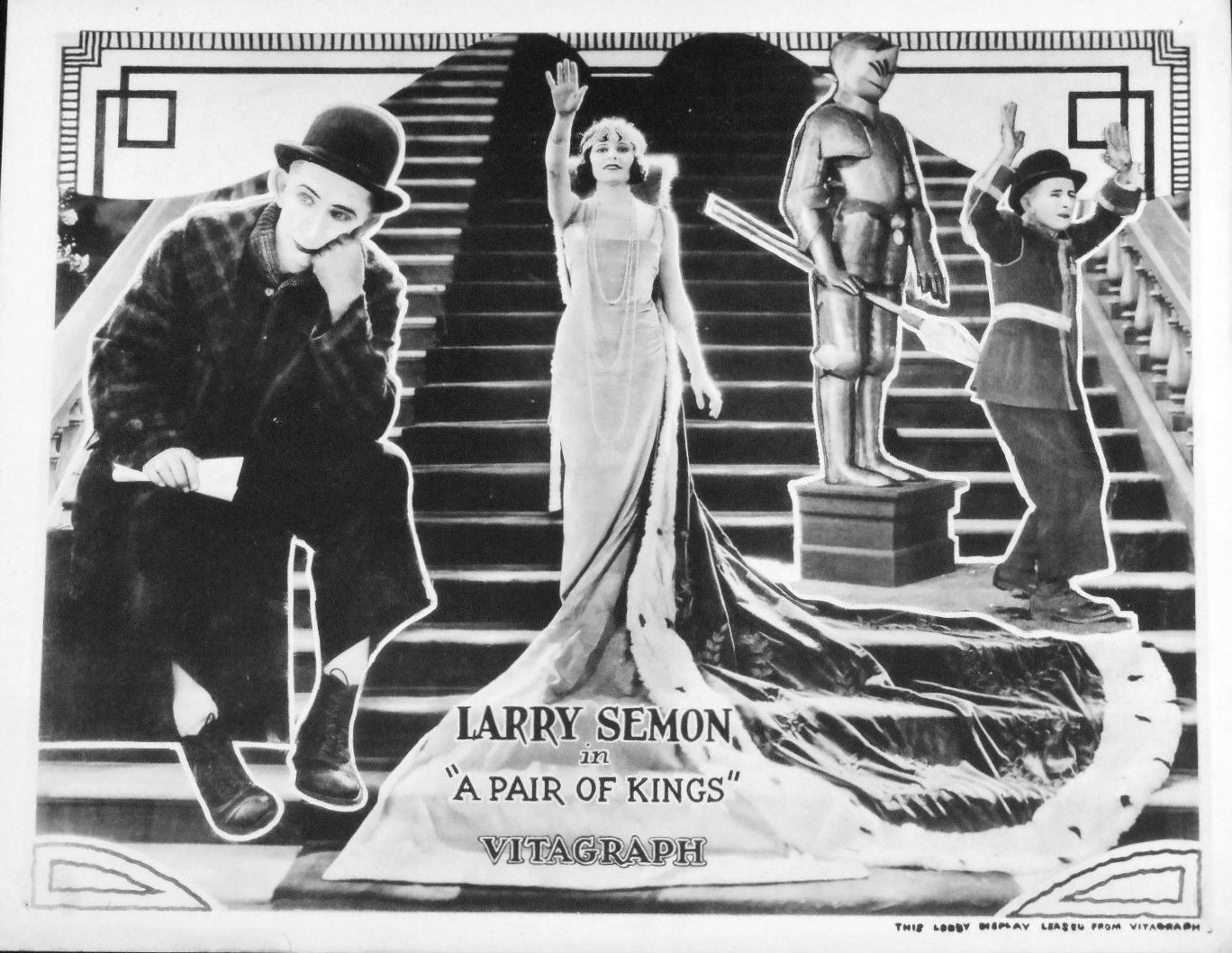
Lobby card

== Plot ==
As described in a film magazine, King August (Semon) is threatened with a revolution and death, so he abdicates in favor of the Stranger (Semon), a dockworker who looks like the King, who is hidden in a box and smuggled into the palace. The new ruler proves too lively for the plotters, and after smashing numerous vases over their heads, the plotters are dumped into a cistern beneath the palace. The dockworker is knighted by the newly crowned queen (Carlisle).

== Cast ==
- Larry Semon as King August / Stranger
- Lucille Carlisle as Princess Lucille
- Oliver Hardy as General Alarm (credited as Babe Hardy)
- William Hauber as Bit Role (uncredited)
- Joe Rock as Bit Role (uncredited)
