= Fatty's Jonah Day =

1914 film

- Directed by: Fatty Arbuckle
- Produced by: Mack Sennett
- Starring: Fatty Arbuckle
- Release date: November 16, 1914
- Country: United States
- Languages: Silent; English intertitles

Fatty's Jonah Day is a 1914 American short comedy film directed by and starring Fatty Arbuckle.

== Cast ==
- Roscoe "Fatty" Arbuckle
- Edward Dillon (as Eddie Dillon)
- Frank Hayes
- Norma Nichols
- Ted Edwards - Cop (uncredited)

== See also ==
- List of American films of 1914
- Fatty Arbuckle filmography
