= The Bell Hop =

1921 film

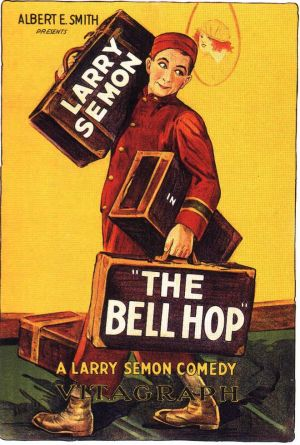
- Film poster
- Directed by: Larry Semon; Norman Taurog
- Written by: Larry Semon; Norman Taurog
- Produced by: Larry Semon; Albert E. Smith
- Starring: Oliver Hardy
- Cinematography: Hans F. Koenekamp
- Distributed by: Vitagraph Company of America
- Release date: September 18, 1921
- Running time: 20 minutes
- Country: United States
- Language: Silent (English intertitles)

The Bell Hop is a 1921 American silent comedy film directed by Larry Semon and Norman Taurog and featuring Oliver Hardy.

== Cast ==
- Larry Semon as The bellhop
- Oliver Hardy as Hotel manager (as Babe Hardy)
- Frank Alexander as A government official
- Al Thompson
- Pete Gordon
- Norma Nichols as A maid
- William Hauber as Hotel detective
- Walter Wilkinson as Little boy

== See also ==
- List of American films of 1921
