= The Star Boarder (1919 film) =

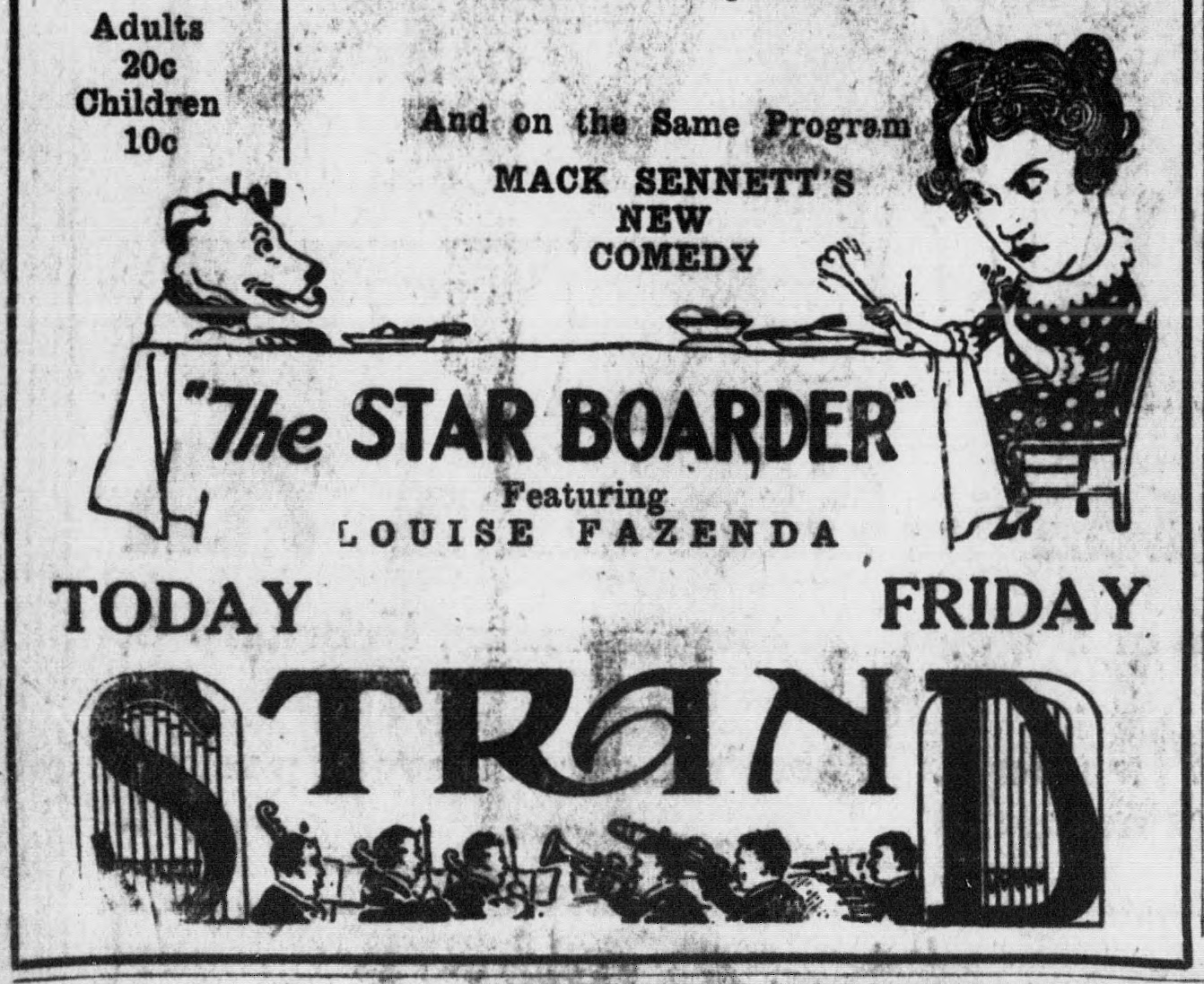
- Contemporary advertisement
- Directed by: Larry Semon
- Written by: Larry Semon (scenario)
- Starring: Larry Semon; Lucille Carlisle
- Distributed by: Vitagraph Company of America
- Release date: May 26, 1919 (United States)
- Running time: 22 minutes
- Country: United States
- Languages: Silent; English intertitles

The Star Boarder is a 1919 American silent comedy short written and directed by and starring Larry Semon. The film also stars Lucille Carlisle, and features Norma Shearer (in her film debut) in an uncredited role as a beauty pageant contestant. The film is extant and available online. The plot has a released prisoner desiring a return to prison and swapping places with an escapee.

== Cast ==
- Larry Semon
- Lucille Carlisle
- Frank Alexander
- The Beauties Squad (including Norma Shearer)
