= Dull Care =

1919 film by Larry Semon

- Directed by: Larry Semon
- Written by: Larry Semon
- Produced by: Albert E. Smith
- Starring: Oliver Hardy
- Release date: October 6, 1919
- Country: United States
- Language: Silent with English intertitles

Dull Care is a 1919 American silent comedy film written and directed by Larry Semon and featuring Oliver Hardy. It was Semon and Hardy's first film together.

== Plot ==
The following plot summary appeared in Wid's Daily (The Film Daily) for December 16, 1919:

The best thing in the number is the broad comedy business in which a wife hides several men in her apartments, and when her husband, comedy police chief, comes home. This is in-and-out-of-hiding-places stuff that gets numerous laughs — also there is some fair chase stuff. The comedy is of the slapstick order, built around the efforts of the cops to round up the gang of crooks.

The finishing footage is quite speedy, but of the usual type of stuff' in which the burlesquers chase each other all over the top of a speeding trolley car and the like. The chase stuff contains a few thrills, too, chief of them being an automobile dashing over a cliff.

== Cast ==
- Larry Semon as Larry, a Detective
- William Hauber as Chief Crook (as Bill Hauber)
- Frank Alexander as Chief of Police
- Lucille Carlisle as Chief of Police's Wife
- Oliver Hardy as A Janitor (as Babe Hardy)

== See also ==
- List of American films of 1919
- Oliver Hardy filmography
