= Lightning Love =

1923 film

- Directed by: James D. Davis; Larry Semon
- Written by: Larry Semon
- Produced by: James D. Davis; Larry Semon
- Starring: Oliver Hardy
- Release date: October 23, 1923
- Country: United States
- Language: Silent with English intertitles

Lightning Love is a 1923 silent comedy film featuring Oliver Hardy.

== Cast ==
- Larry Semon - Larry, a Suitor
- Kathleen Myers - Rhea
- Oliver Hardy - Oliver, the Other Suitor (as Babe Hardy)
- Spencer Bell - Butler
- Al Thompson - Father
- William Hauber
- Pete Gordon
- Elma the Monkey

== See also ==
- List of American films of 1923
