= Kid Speed =

1924 film

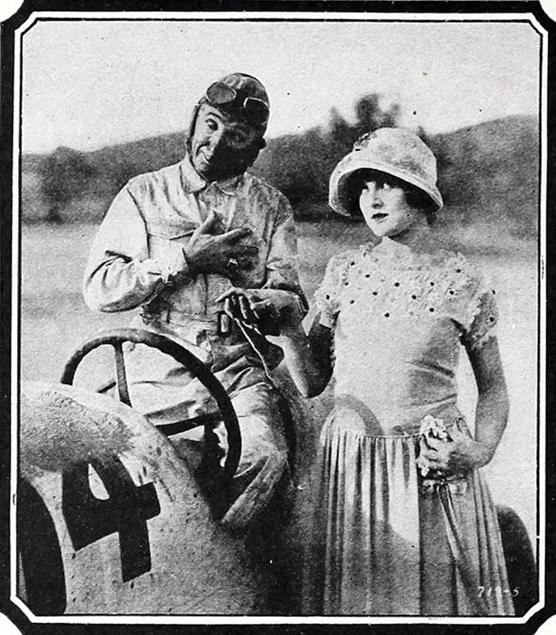
- Larry Semon and Dorothy Dwan in Kid Speed
- Directed by: Larry Semon; Noel M. Smith
- Written by: Leon Lee; Larry Semon; Noel M. Smith
- Produced by: Larry Semon
- Starring: Oliver Hardy
- Cinematography: Hans F. Koenekamp
- Distributed by: Educational Film Exchanges
- Release date: November 16, 1924
- Running time: 18 minutes
- Country: United States
- Language: Silent (English intertitles)

Kid Speed also known as The Four Wheeled Terror is a 1924 American silent comedy film directed by Larry Semon and featuring Oliver Hardy.

== Plot ==
A group of young men are tuning up their race cars and sportsters in a small garage. Dangerous Dan McGraw (Hardy) gets a note from rich Mr Du Poys saying he wants to see his car and will bring his daughter along. They arrive in an open-top chauffeur driven limo.

Meanwhile, Kid Speed checks his appearance in a broken mirror. His car is under repair and a black mechanic lies underneath while it backfires. The noise wakes the neighbour: town sheriff Phil O'Delfya. He shouts across to be quiet. Kid Speed apologises, They plan to quietly drive off but instead he goes into reverse, crashing through all walls and hitting the sheriff's bed. When he drives forward he has the sheriff on his bed in tow. His speed increases. On a bend the bed detaches and goes down a steep slope with the sheriff cartwheeling into a lake at the bottom.

Kid Speed is truly driving fast in his no.14 race car, with dust being thrown up behind him. He arrives at the garage where Du Poys' daughter waves to him in admiration. Dan objects to their flirting.

We jump to the racetrack, labelled RAJC on the small hill behind. Dan is in no.8 and plans to sabotage Kid Speed. They are told the winner can take out Du Poys' daughter every Wednesday.

A dozen or so cars speed around the heavily banked track for two laps then go on a cross country section. The racing is clearly real. Kid Speed is the only car with a second: his mechanic squeezed in beside him. He gets told the car has no brakes and he laughs. The mechanic gets thrown out on a corner. Kid Speed crashes and is passed by the other cars. The car goes off on its own and he runs faster than the cars to jump back in.

Dan's car crosses a concrete bridge which then blows up, but Kid Speed launches over the gap. It becomes a two car race. A second huge explosion causes a landslide which is meant to bury Kid Speed but buries Dan instead.

Kid Speed crosses the finish line in a cloud of dust. He kisses the girl.

== Cast ==
- Dorothy Dwan as Lou DuPoise
- James J. Jeffries as Blacksmith / Tailor
- Oliver Hardy as Dan "Dangerous Dan" McGraw (credited as Oliver N. Hardy)
- Frank Alexander as Mr. Avery DuPoise
- William Hauber as Sheriff Phil O'Delfa
- Larry Semon as "The Speed Kid"
- Spencer Bell as The Speed Kid's Co-Driver and Mechanic (uncredited)

== See also ==
- List of American films of 1924
