= Frank Alexander (actor) =

American comedian and actor (1879–1937)

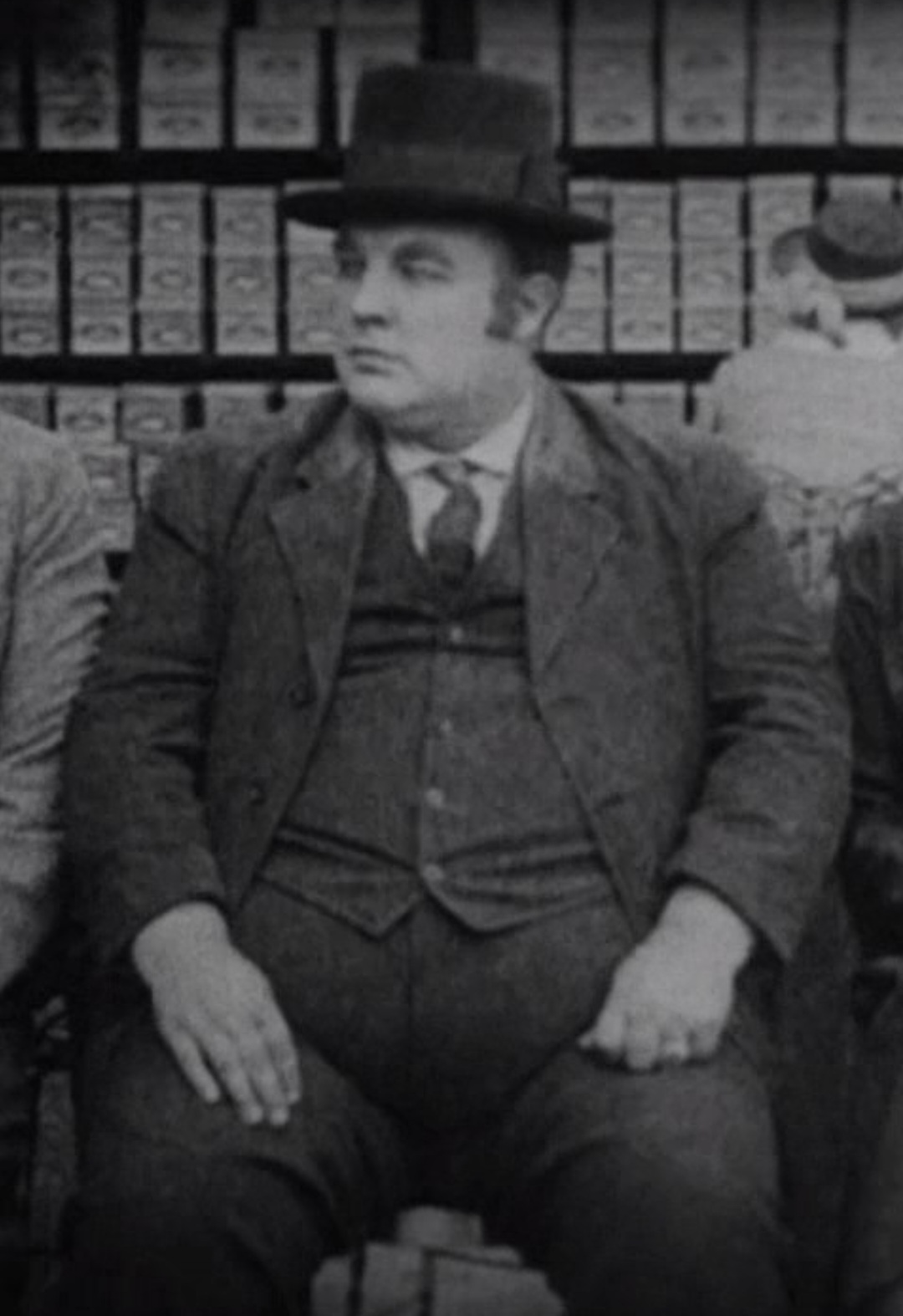
- Alexander in A Lover's Lost Control (1915)
- Born: Frank Dwight Alexander; May 25, 1879; Olympia, Washington, U.S.
- Died: September 8, 1937 (aged 58); Los Angeles, California, U.S.
- Resting place: Hollywood Forever Cemetery
- Other names: Tiny Alexander; Fatty Alexander
- Occupations: Comedian; Actor
- Years active: 1915–1933

Frank Dwight Alexander (May 25, 1879 – September 8, 1937) was an American silent film comedian and actor. He was occasionally billed as Fatty Alexander.

== Biography ==
In the mid-1910s, Alexander acted in comedy roles for Keystone Studios, often with Sydney Chaplin.

Alexander, who was morbidly obese (350 pounds), played villains in the films of Larry Semon, who are often the father of Semon's love interest. He is best known to contemporary audiences for portraying a villainous interpretation of Uncle Henry, eventually proclaimed "Prince of Whales" upon reaching the Emerald City in Semon's Wizard of Oz. He was also part of the comedy team called "A Ton Of Fun" with two other large actors, Kewpie Ross and Hilliard Karr.

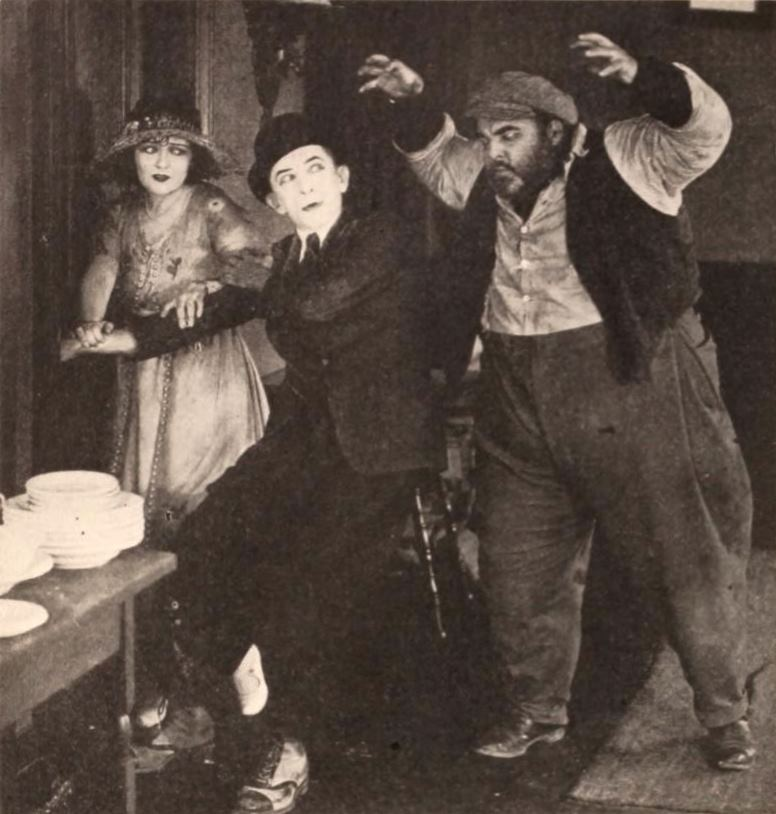
Performing with Norma Nichols and Larry Semon in The Rent Collector (1921)

Richard M. Roberts's article in Classic Images listed the top ten ingredients of a Larry Semon film, which began with these four:

1. Larry Semon
2. A heroine (usually Larry's current girlfriend or wife)
3. A fat guy (usually Oliver Hardy, to play the villain)
4. A really fat guy (usually Frank Alexander, to play Larry's current girlfriend's father)

He was proclaimed at the time as one of the three fattest actors ever to appear on the screen, with Roscoe "Fatty" Arbuckle as one of the others.

Alexander died of a heart attack on September 8, 1937, aged 58. He weighed 465 pounds when he died. He was cremated two days later at Hollywood Cemetery. His ashes are unmarked but lie in the Garden of Beginnings at Hollywood Forever Cemetery near Los Angeles.

== Filmography ==
- Melting Millions (1917)
- By the Sad Sea Waves (1917)
- Rainbow Island (1917)
- Huns and Hyphens (1918)
- Bears and Bad Men (1918)
- The Simple Life (1919)
- Dull Care (1919)
- The Star Boarder (1919)
- The Stage Hand (1920)
- The Bakery (1921)
- The Rent Collector (1921)
- The Fall Guy (1921)
- The Bell Hop (1921)
- The Sawmill (1922)
- The Show (1922)
- Cyclone Jones (1923)
- Her Boy Friend (1924)
- Kid Speed (1924)
- Wizard of Oz (1925) as Uncle Henry
- Hop to It! (1925)
- The Perfect Clown (1925)
- Oh, What a Night! (1926)
- Play Safe (1927) with Monty Banks
- The Barber Shop (1933) with W. C. Fields
