= The Gown Shop =

1932 film

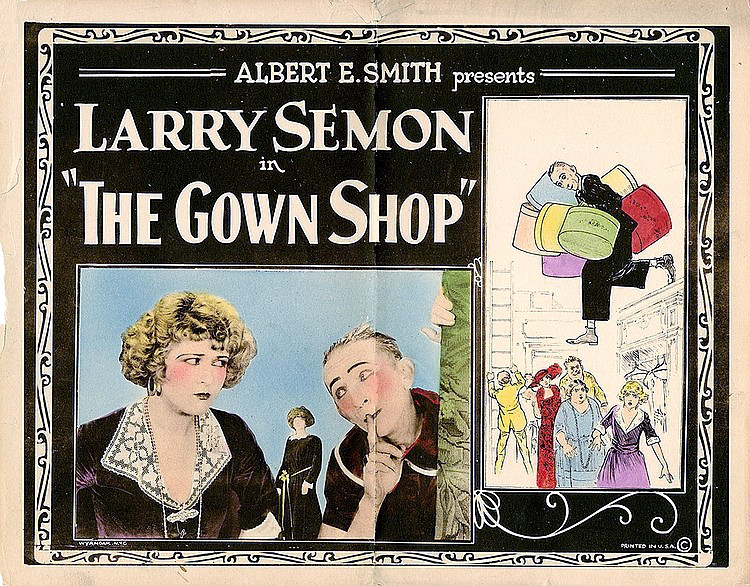
- Lobby card
- Directed by: Larry Semon
- Written by: Larry Semon
- Produced by: Larry Semon
- Starring: Oliver Hardy
- Production company: Larry Semon Productions
- Distributed by: Vitagraph Company of America
- Release date: August 14, 1923
- Running time: 2 reels; 600m
- Country: United States
- Language: Silent (English intertitles)

The Gown Shop is a 1923 American silent comedy film directed by and starring Larry Semon that featured Oliver Hardy.

== Plot ==
This plot summary was published in The Moving Picture World for October 13, 1923:

Vitagraph announces the first of the season's four Larry Semon two-reel comedies, "The Gown Shop," is now in the exchanges. It is described as a girlie-girlie show with Katherine Meyers in the leading feminine role. There are scores of beautiful girls in gorgeous costumes. Semon has introduced a jazzing alligator, which is said to be even funnier than his famous walking egg.

== Cast ==
- Larry Semon as Larry, a salesman
- Kathleen Myers as Head saleslady
- Oliver Hardy as Store manager (credited as Babe Hardy)
- Fred DeSilva as Dressmaker (credited as F.F. DeSylva)
- Pete Gordon as Worker
- William Hauber (credited as Bill Hauber)
- Frank Hayes as Wife in audience
- James Donnelly as Husband
- Spencer Bell as Janitor
- Harry DeRoy as Audience member
- Dorothea Wolbert as Audience member
- Otto Lederer as Audience member

== See also ==
- List of American films of 1923
- Oliver Hardy filmography
