= H. F. Koenekamp =

American special effects artist (1891–1992)

- Born: Hans Frederick Koenekamp; December 3, 1891; Denison, Iowa, U.S.
- Died: September 12, 1992 (aged 100); Northridge, California, U.S.
- Occupations: Special effects artist, cinematographer
- Years active: 1914-1957

Hans Frederick Koenekamp (December 3, 1891 – September 12, 1992) was an American special effects artist and cinematographer. He was nominated for an Oscar for Best Special Effects for the film Air Force (1943). He worked on more than 90 films during his career.

Cinematographer Fred J. Koenekamp (1922–2017) was his son.

== Partial filmography ==
- Mabel's Strange Predicament (1914)
- Tillie's Punctured Romance (1914)
- The Stage Hand (1920)
- The Fall Guy (1921)
- The Bell Hop (1921)
- The Sawmill (1922)
- The Show (1922)
- The Agent (1922)
- No Wedding Bells (1923)
- The Girl in the Limousine (1924)
- Kid Speed (1924)
- The Wizard of Oz (1925)
- Stop, Look and Listen (1926)
- Spuds (1927)
- China Clipper (1936)
- Air Force (1943)
- Spencer's Mountain (1963)

== See also ==
- List of centenarians (actors, filmmakers and entertainers)
