= No Wedding Bells =

1923 film

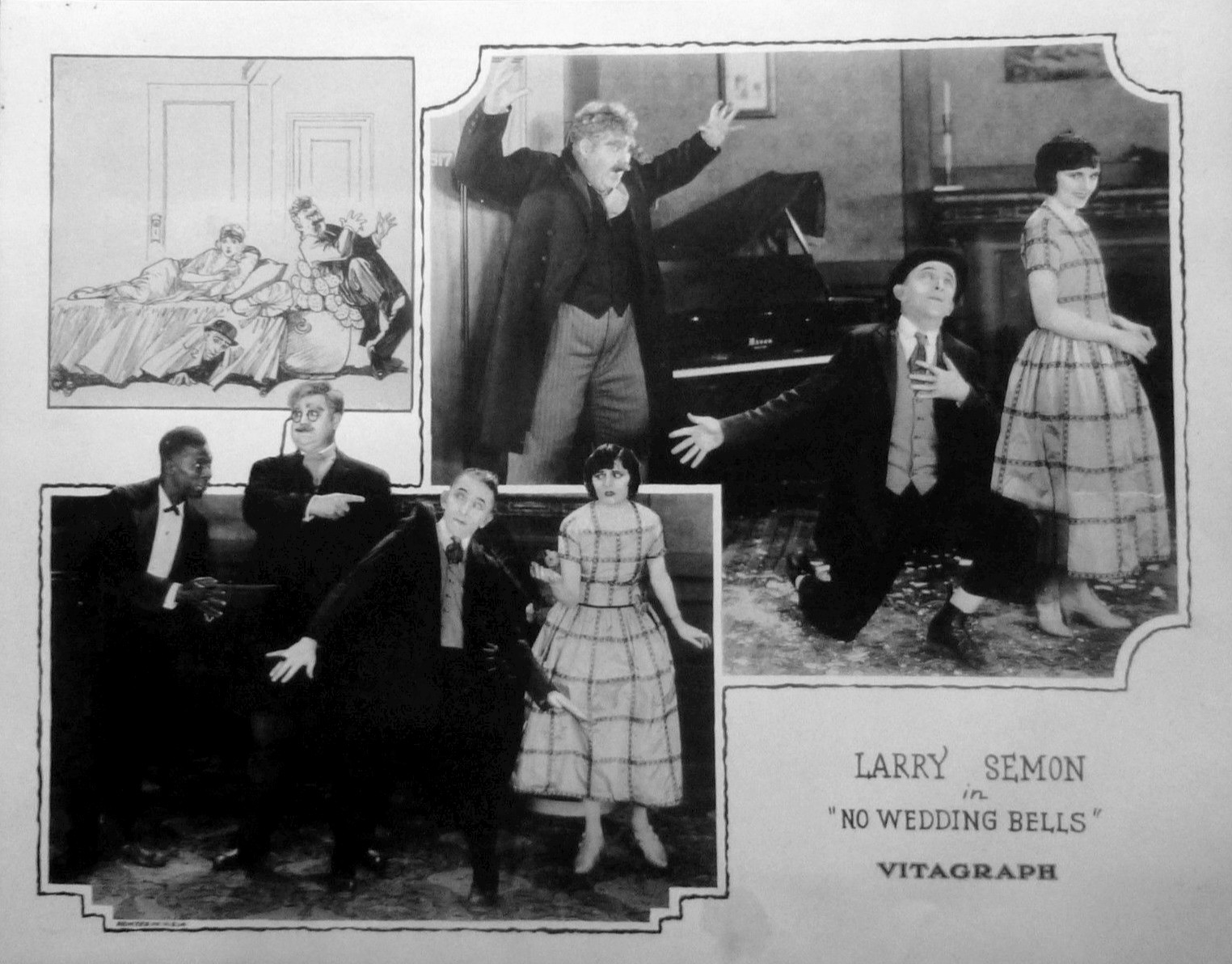
- Lobby card
- Directed by: Mort Peebles; Larry Semon
- Written by: Larry Semon
- Produced by: Larry Semon
- Starring: Oliver Hardy
- Cinematography: Hans F. Koenekamp
- Production company: Vitagraph Studios
- Distributed by: Vitagraph Studios
- Release date: January 1923
- Running time: 2 reels
- Country: United States
- Language: Silent (English intertitles)

No Wedding Bells is a 1923 American silent short comedy film featuring Oliver Hardy.

== Cast ==
- Larry Semon as Larry
- Lucille Carlisle as The Girl
- Oliver Hardy as The Girl's Father (credited as Babe Hardy)
- Spencer Bell as The Butler
- Glen Cavender as An Irate Husband
- Kathleen Myers as Bit Role (uncredited)

== See also ==
- List of American films of 1923
- Oliver Hardy filmography
