= Horseshoes (1923 film) =

1923 film

- Directed by: James D. Davis; Larry Semon
- Written by: Larry Semon
- Produced by: James D. Davis; Larry Semon
- Starring: Oliver Hardy
- Production company: Vitagraph Studios
- Distributed by: Vitagraph Studios
- Release date: December 10, 1923
- Country: United States
- Language: Silent with English intertitles

Horseshoes is a 1923 American silent comedy film featuring Oliver Hardy.

== Plot ==
According to the copyright description, "'Dynamite Duffy', champion pugilist, arrives at his training quarters, to take his daily exercise, which consists in knocking out his sparring partners. He offers anybody $50 who remains on his feet after one minute of fighting. There are numerous volunteers, but Duffy is too powerful for them, and the sparring partners are carried from the training quarters in various states of disablement. Among those reading the announcement, is Larry. The grocer across the way has a daughter, whom Duffy intends to marry. The girl is fond of Larry, however, and warns him against tackling Duffy. Larry is doubtful, but when he sees a poster of Duffy on the door, he cannot refrain from throwing fruit at it. Duffy himself takes the place of the poster and is hit in the eye with some fruit. To punish Larry he drags him into the training quarters, while the crowd outside waits to see the outcome. Duffy is carried out and Larry appears, the victor. He tosses his boxing gloves aside and they land on Duffy’s toes. Here Duffy learns that Larry has two horseshoes in the gloves. He starts after Larry, but the latter interests him in a hat-trick-tossing the hat around and catching it again. Duffy tries the trick but tosses the hat on a car-track where a trolley crushes the hat. Again he pursues Larry, who effects his escape.

Larry courts the girl and they play with a monkey. The grocer plays pool with one of Duffy’s gang, and loses his money. Larry plans to win it back. Larry stations a big policeman outside the poolroom, so that Duffy is afraid to attack him. Larry bets all his money on the game and in one shot clears the table of the balls. The cop protects him from violence. A clothing merchant substitutes a dummy for the policeman and Duffy leaps on Larry, Larry escapes, and, posing as a cripple [sic], by lying down with pants on his shoulder and shoes on his hands, fools Duffy for awhile. Larry then hides by disguising himself with flour sacks, scaring a negro [sic] who believes Larry to be a spook. Duffy plans to marry the girl at once. The monkey jabs Duffy with a hat-pin, and then the animal has a meeting with a skunk which drives the monkey to a bathtub to remove the odor. Larry interferes with the wedding by placing a barrel over Duffy’s head. And escapes with the girl. They dash off in a motorcycle with Duffy and his gang following in an auto. The grocer takes the girl away from Larry, and Duffy leaps to the side-car. The side-car is knocked off by a collision with a fire hydrant and the pursuing gang are wet when their auto stops over the broken hydrant. Larry has numerous escapes with the gang after him, and is headed for a cliff. He manages to catch a rope and save himself from being dashed to the foot of the cliff. Duffy holds up Larry and the girl with a revolver, but falls in a bog, as he attempts to punish them. Larry and the girl are left free to continue their courtship."

== Cast ==
- Larry Semon as Larry
- Kathleen Myers as The Grocer's Daughter
- Oliver Hardy as Dynamite Duffy (as Babe Hardy)
- James Donnelly
- Spencer Bell

== See also ==
- List of American films of 1923
