= Her Boy Friend =

1924 film

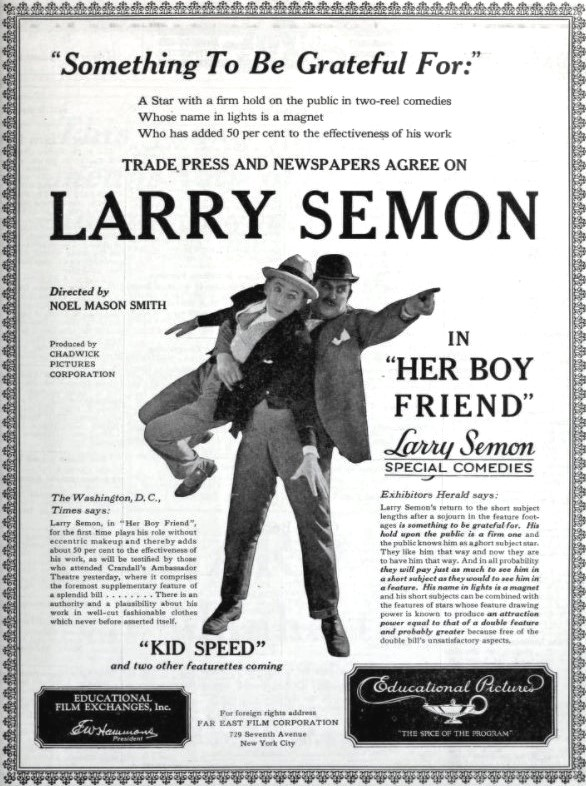
- Trade advertisement
- Directed by: Larry Semon; Noel M. Smith
- Written by: Larry Semon; Noel M. Smith
- Produced by: Larry Semon
- Starring: Oliver Hardy
- Production company: Chadwick Pictures Corporation
- Distributed by: Educational Film Exchanges
- Release date: September 28, 1924
- Running time: 2 reels
- Country: United States
- Language: Silent (English intertitles)

The full film

Her Boy Friend is a 1924 American silent comedy film featuring Oliver Hardy.

== Cast ==
- Larry Semon as Larry, the Chief's son
- Dorothy Dwan as Iva Method, the girl detective
- Alma Bennett as The Vamp
- Oliver Hardy as Killer Kid (credited as Oliver N. Hardy)
- Fred Spencer as Headquarters Hank (credited as Fred Spence)
- Frank Alexander as Slim Chance
- Spencer Bell as Dock worker
- William Hauber

== See also ==
- List of American films of 1924
