= Larry Semon =

American actor, director, producer, and screenwriter (1889–1928)

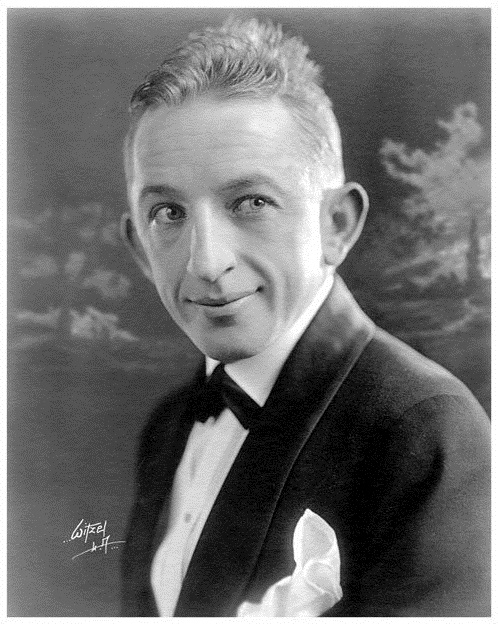
- Semon, c. 1922
- Born: Lawrence Semon; February 9, 1889; West Point, Mississippi, U.S.
- Died: October 8, 1928 (aged 39); Victorville, California, U.S.
- Other names: Lawrence Semon, Zigoto, Ridolini, Jaimito, Tomasín
- Occupations: Actor; director; producer; screenwriter
- Years active: 1915–1928
- Spouses: Lucille Carlisle (m. 1922; div. 1923) Dorothy Dwan (m. 1925)
- Children: 1

The Man from Egypt (Dutch intertitles). Collection EYE Film Institute Netherlands.

Worries and wobbles, a 1917 farce with intertitles in Dutch. Collection EYE Film Institute Netherlands.

Lawrence Semon (February 9, 1889 – October 8, 1928) was an American actor, director, producer, and screenwriter during the silent film era. In his day, Semon was considered a major movie comedian, but he is now remembered mainly for working with both Stan Laurel and Oliver Hardy before they started working together. He directed and appeared in the 1925 silent film The Wizard of Oz, which had a slight influence on the better-known 1939 talkie The Wizard of Oz released by MGM. The film was included in the 2005 three-disc DVD version of the 1939 film, along with other silent Oz movies.

== Early life ==
Born in West Point, Mississippi on February 9, 1889, Semon was the son of a travelling Jewish vaudeville magician Zera Semon, who billed himself as "Zera the Great". His mother, Irene Semon (née Rea), worked as Zera's assistant. Along with his older sister, Semon joined his parents' act until his father's death. After completing his education in Savannah, Georgia, Semon moved to New York City, where he worked for The New York Sun and later The New York Morning Telegraph as a cartoonist, comics artist and graphic artist. While working as an artist, Semon appeared in monologues in vaudeville, where he attracted the attention of Vitagraph Studios. In 1915, he was offered a contract with the company.

== Career ==
After signing with Vitagraph, Semon worked behind the scenes as a scenario writer, director, and film producer for actor Hughie Mack's films. He occasionally cast himself in bit parts in the films he worked on. When Mack left Vitagraph, Semon began playing the lead roles. He usually played a white-faced goof in derby hat and overalls who would enter any given setting (a bakery, a restaurant, a construction site, a prison camp, etc.) and cause chaos, with people being covered with debris and property being destroyed. His short slapstick comedies were made and released quickly and prolifically, making Semon very familiar to moviegoers.

As his fame grew, his films expanded from one reel (about 12 minutes) to two reels, and Semon was given a free hand in making them. This became a dangerous policy because Semon became notorious for being expensive and extravagant: his two-reel comedies could easily cost more than an average five-reel feature film. As a former cartoonist, Semon staged similarly cartoony sight gags. These were not achieved with camera tricks or miniatures: Semon used full-sized props and structures, but on an epic scale. No gag was too big for Semon. He loved chase sequences involving airplanes (sometimes using three in a film), exploding barns, falling water towers, auto wrecks and/or explosions, and liberal use of substances in which to douse people. A typical Semon comedy might involve barrels of flour, sacks of soot, gallons of ink, pools of motor oil, or pits filled with mud. For example, in Semon's The Bell Hop, a man sleeping under the spray of a malfunctioning fountain imagines he is swimming in the ocean, and in his sleep he dives off the bed, through the floor, and into a vat of paint in the lobby below.

Oliver Hardy recalled how Larry Semon would always think big and spend accordingly:

He helped bring about his own downfall. I can remember one instance that was typical. Understand this now. We were doing a two-reeler called The Sawmill, Just a regular two-reeler, to be done on a regular two-reel budget, which wasn't a lot. But Larry took us up on location and I mean location. It was a North Woods picture, and Larry took a very big company up into the wilds of the California mountains. He built -- believe it or not, he built permanent log cabins and buildings for a full company with all the comforts of life, and we spent about three months on that picture. Vitagraph after a while insisted that he become his own producer because they just weren't going to foot all those bills. And then when the bills started to come in, he'd worry -- but then he was always worrying, and the funny thing is that he was never able to figure out why things weren't going well for him.

Semon also spent freely in his personal life, with frequent long-distance travel. Director Norman Taurog recalled that by the mid-1920s Semon would hand a script to him and then depart for New York, leaving Taurog to film the script with stunt double Bill Hauber impersonating Semon. Upon Semon's return to Hollywood, Taurog would film close-ups of Semon to fit into the action filmed with Hauber.

Semon tried to reverse his money problems by entering the more lucrative field of feature films. He produced and starred in a few features in the mid-1920s, including the financial disaster The Wizard of Oz in 1925, remembered today for the appearance of Oliver Hardy as the Tin Woodsman. His last starring feature, for Pathé release, was Spuds, a military comedy released on April 10, 1927.

== Last films ==
In July 1926, major comedy producer Mack Sennett hired Semon -- but not as a comedian. He was signed to direct the young comedians Alice Day and Eddie Quillan in a series of two-reel shorts. Semon's stay was short, and by 1927 he was back as a starring comedian, in a series of eight two-reel comedies released through Educational Pictures. Although he took a backward step from feature films, Semon's return to slapstick shorts was greeted enthusiastically in the marketplace. Motion Picture World reported, "At preview showings of Semon's latest efforts, in Los Angeles and New York City theatres, the subjects were heartily received, proving beyond a doubt that the Semon fan clan are still as much in evidence as ever and the comedian has lost none of the old pantomimic skill that originally brought him worldwide fame and fortune." Some exhibitors, however, graded his new films as being only fair. "Semon used to be a good bet but not now." (S. B. Kennedy of Selkirk, Manitoba). "Semon is done. This is far from good." (Philip E. Tyas, Amherstburg, Ontario). Another exhibitor claimed to spot a flagrant shortcut, either attempted by Semon to save money, or by Educational to salvage an unfinished picture: "Educational should be prosecuted for selling a reissue to exhibitors without so stating in the contract. The last half of this picture is negative from an old two-reel Vitagraph comedy that Semon made several years ago. I've run it at least six times. I dare them to prove that the tower scenes and ambulance scenes are not a Vitagraph reissue." (Sun Theatre, Kansas City, Missouri).

== Struggles ==
Semon's contract with Educational was not renewed. He declared personal bankruptcy on March 19, 1928, with liabilities of $454,639 (the equivalent of $8,878,000 today) and assets of $300 ($5,900 today). He signed for a series of personal appearances in New York, but while traveling on the vaudeville circuit, he suffered a nervous breakdown and went back to Los Angeles.

Semon was admitted to a sanatorium in Victorville, California, where on October 8, 1928—at the age of 39—he died of pneumonia and tuberculosis. His wife Dorothy Dwan was reported to be at his bedside when he died. He was cremated and his ashes were given to his wife. In its obituary for Semon, the trade paper Variety speculated that ongoing stress related to his dire financial circumstances was a contributing factor in his demise, alluding to the 1925 production of The Wizard of Oz as the major cause of his money woes: "This screen disaster caused Mr. Semon no end of worry and repeated efforts to recoup only added to his discomfiture. Last March he filed a voluntary petition in bankruptcy, listing debts at nearly $500,000. Ceaseless worry undermined his health making him an easy victim of pneumonia."

Dorothy Dwan remained with the motion picture industry behind the scenes, and joined the trade press. She became a writer and editor, specializing in home economics and cooking, and was published concurrently in Motion Picture, Movie Classic, and Hollywood magazines.

== Nicknames ==
International audiences knew Larry Semon as Zigoto in France, Ridolini in Italy, Jaimito ("Jimmy") in Spain, and Tomasín ("Tommy") in the 1940 re-releases by Manuel Rotellar.

== Filmography ==
As a director, not a star:

- Tubby Turns the Tables (1916)
- Terry's Tea Party (1916)
- Out Ag'in, in Ag'in (1916)
- More Money Than Manners (1916)
- The Battler (1916)
- Losing Weight (1916)
- The Man from Egypt (1916)
- A Jealous Guy (1916)
- Romance and Roughhouse (1916)
- There and Back (1916)
- A Villainous Villain (1916)
- Love and Loot (1916)
- Sand, Scamps and Strategy (1916)
- She Who Last Laughs (1916)
- Walls and Wallops (1916)
- Jumps and Jealousy (1916)
- His Conscious Conscience (1916)
- Hash and Havoc (1916)
- Captain Jinks' Evolution (1916)
- Rah! Rah! Rah! (1916)
- Help! Help! Help! (1916)
- Shanks and Chivalry (1916)
- Speed and Spunk (1917)
- Captain Jinks' Widow (1917)
- Captain Jinks' Nephew's Wife (1917)
- Captain Jinks' Dilemma (1917)
- Bullies and Bullets (1917)
- Jolts and Jewelry (1917)
- Big Bluffs and Bowling Balls (1917)
- Somewhere in Any Place (1917)
- Rips and Rushes (1917)
- He Never Touched Me (1917)
- Cops and Cussedness (1917)
- Masks and Mishaps (1917)
- Guff and Gunplay (1917)
- Pests and Promises (1917)
- Footlights and Fakers (1917)
- Bombs and Blunders (1917)
- Turks and Troubles (1917)
- Flatheads and Flivvers (1917)
- Dubs and Drygoods (1917)
- Hazards and Home Runs (1917)
- Gall and Gasoline (1917)
- Boasts and Boldness (1917)
- Worries and Wobbles (1917)
- Shells and Shivers (1917)

As a Comedy Star:

- Chumps and Chances (1917)
- Gall and Golf (1917)
- Slips and Slackers (1917)
- Risks and Roughnecks (1917)
- Plans and Pajamas (1917)
- Plagues and Puppy Love (1917)
- Sports and Splashes (1917)
- Tough Luck and Tin Lizzies (1917)
- Rough Toughs and Roof Tops (1917)
- Spooks and Spasms (1917)
- Noisy Naggers and Nosey Neighbors (1917)
- Guns and Greasers (1918)
- Babes and Boobs (1918)
- Rooms and Rumors (1918)
- Meddlers and Moonshiners (1918)
- Stripes and Stumbles (1918)
- Rummies and Razors (1918)
- Whistles and Windows (1918)
- Spies and Spills (1918)
- Romans and Rascals (1918)
- Skids and Scalawags (1918)
- Boodle and Bandits (1918)
- Hindoos and Hazards (1918)
- Bathing Beauties and Big Boobs (1918)
- Dunces and Dangers (1918)
- Mutts and Motors (1918)
- Huns and Hyphens (1918)
- Bears and Bad Men (1918)
- Frauds and Frenzies (1918)
- Humbugs and Husbands (1918)
- Pluck and Plotters (1918)
- Traps and Tangles (1919)
- Scamps and Scandals (1919)
- Well, I'll Be (1919)
- Passing the Buck (1919)
- The Star Boarder (1919)
- His Home Sweet Home (1919)
- The Simple Life (1919)
- Between the Acts (1919)
- Dull Care (1919)
- Dew Drop Inn (1919)
- The Head Waiter (1919)
- The Grocery Clerk (1919)
- The Fly Cop (1920)
- School Days (1920)
- Solid Concrete (1920)
- The Stage Hand (1920)
- The Suitor (1920)
- The Sportsman (1921)
- The Hick (1921)
- The Bakery (1921)
- The Rent Collector (1921)
- The Fall Guy (1921)
- The Bell Hop (1921)
- The Sawmill (1922)
- The Show (1922)
- A Pair of Kings (1922)
- Golf (1922)
- The Agent (1922)
- The Counter Jumper (1922)
- No Wedding Bells (1923)
- The Barnyard (1923)
- The Midnight Cabaret (1923)
- The Gown Shop (1923)
- Lightning Love (1923)
- Horseshoes (1923)
- Trouble Brewing (1924)
- The Girl in the Limousine (1924)
- Her Boy Friend (1924)
- Kid Speed (1924)
- My Best Girl (1925)
- Wizard of Oz (1925)
- The Perfect Clown (1925)
- The Dome Doctor (1925)
- The Cloudhopper (1925)
- Stop, Look and Listen (1926)
- Pass the Dumplings (1927)
- Spuds (1927)
- The Plumber's Daughter (1927)
- A Dozen Socks (1927) (uncredited)
- The Stunt Man (1927)
- Oh, What a Man! (1927)
- Underworld (1927)
- Dummies (1928)
- A Simple Sap (1928)

== Gallery ==
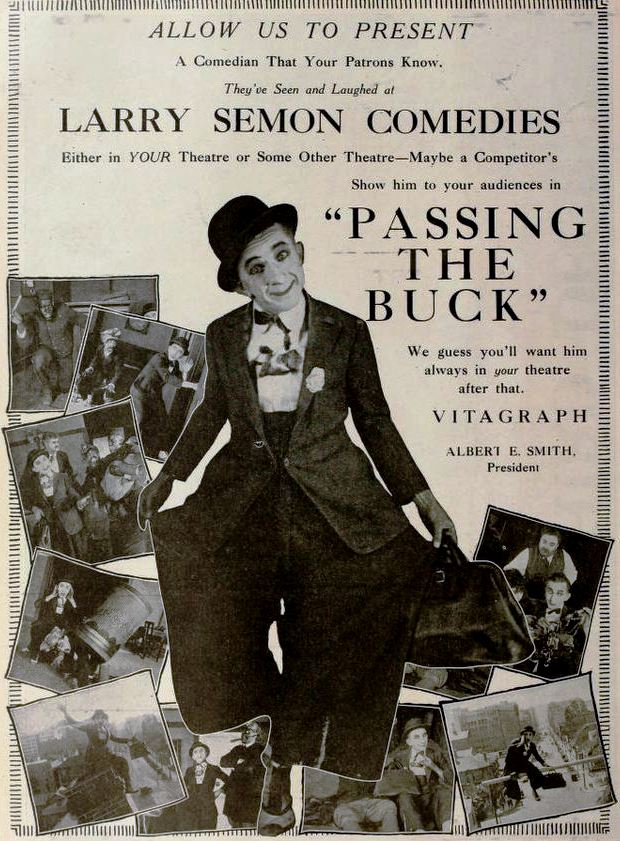
Ad for the comedy short film Passing the Buck
in The Moving Picture World
