= The Kidnapped Bride =

1914 film

- Directed by: Frank Griffin
- Written by: Frank Griffin
- Produced by: Arthur Hotaling
- Starring: Eva Bell; Raymond McKee; Frank Griffin; Oliver Hardy
- Release date: July 4, 1914
- Running time: 6-7 minutes (c. 500 feet)
- Country: United States
- Languages: Silent film English intertitles

The Kidnapped Bride is a lost 1914 American silent comedy film produced by the Lubin Manufacturing Company, starring Eva Bell, Raymond McKee, Frank Griffin, and Oliver Hardy. It is a sequel to A Brewerytown Romance, released earlier the same year.

== Plot ==
(The story picks up where A Brewerytown Romance ends.)

Lena and Cassidy, escorted by Cassidy's fellow cops, head to the church to be married. Emil and Heinz, after they are fished out of the river, plot to kidnap Lena. They start a fight as a diversion and then steal the wedding carriage, pushing Cassidy out but driving off with Lena, as Cassidy and the other cops give chase. When they arrive at the church, Emil and Heinz fight over who is to marry Lena. Emil knocks Heinz out, but is himself knocked out by Lena. The rescue party arrives and Lena collapses in the arms of Cassidy as the cops cheer.

== Cast ==
- Eva Bell as Lena Krautheimer
- Raymond McKee as Emil Schweitzer
- Frank Griffin as Tango Heinz
- Oliver Hardy as Daniel Cassidy (credited as Babe Hardy)

== Production and reception ==
The Kidnapped Bridge was filmed in Jacksonville, Florida, at the Jacksonville unit of the Lubin Manufacturing Company, under the supervision of Arthur Hotaling. It was a short split-reel comedy, lasting approximately 7 minutes, and sharing a single reel of film with a second, unrelated comedy, It's a Shame. The films were released by the General Film Company on July 4, 1914.

The film was written and directed by Frank Griffin, who went on to direct several other short comedies for Lubin. It was a sequel to A Brewerytown Romance, which featured the same cast and characters, and was released a month earlier, on June 2, 1914. Film historian Rob Stone has suggested that both parts were filmed at the same time as a one-reel comedy, which was then cut into two and combined with two other films for split-reel release. Like A Brewerytown Romance, The Kidnapped Bride is notable for an early screen appearance by Oliver Hardy (credited by his nickname, Babe Hardy), who played supporting and occasionally starring roles in many of the Lubin comedies produced by the Jacksonville unit in 1914 and 1915.

The Kidnapped Bride was described by Moving Picture World as "burlesque in the broadest sense", but it received more positive reviews in the trade papers than A Brewerytown Romance. Motion Picture News called it "a laugh throughout", and the New York Dramatic Mirror wrote "Rapid fire comedy presented in a sure manner and a hard-working cast characterize this short farce offering".

== See also ==
- List of American films of 1914
- Oliver Hardy filmography
