= A Fool There Was =

A Fool There Was may refer to:

- A Fool There Was (1914 film) or She Wanted a Car, a comedy directed by Frank Griffin and featuring Oliver Hardy
- A Fool There Was (1915 film), a melodrama directed by Frank Powell and starring Theda Bara
- A Fool There Was (1922 film), a remake of the 1915 film, directed by Emmett J. Flynn
- A Fool There Was (play), a 1909 play by Porter Emerson Browne, basis for the 1915 and 1922 films
