= Flame of Youth =

Flame of Youth may refer to:

- Flame of Youth (1949 film), an American drama film
- Flame of Youth (1920 film), an American silent drama film
- The Flame of Youth, a 1917 American silent adventure film
