= Never Too Old (film) =

1914 film

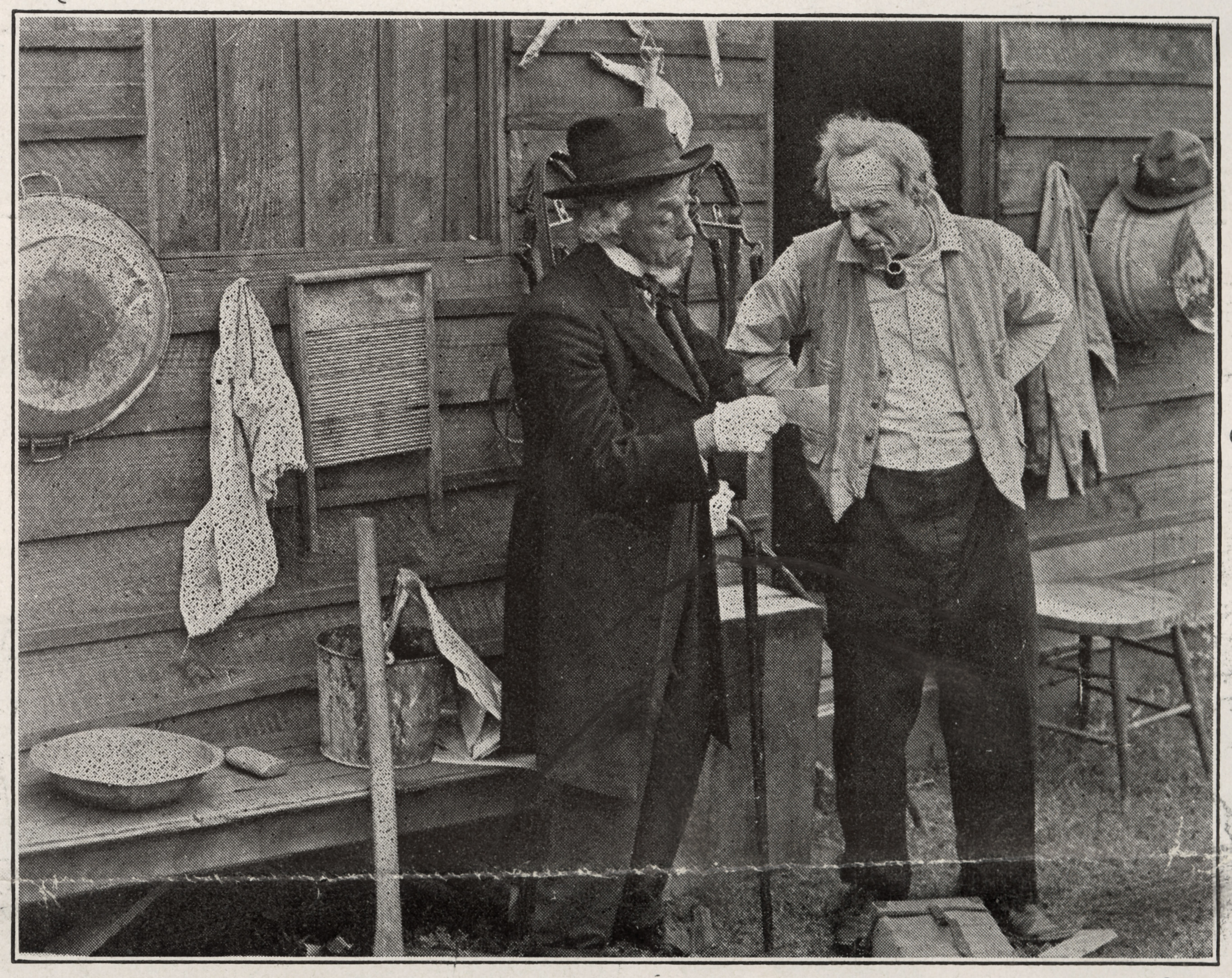
- James Levering and J. A. Murphy in a publicity still from Never Too Old
- Directed by: John A. Murphy
- Written by: Epes W. Sargent
- Produced by: Arthur Hotaling
- Starring: Marguerite Ne Moyer
- Release date: September 1, 1914
- Country: United States
- Languages: Silent film English intertitles

Never Too Old is a 1914 American silent comedy film produced by the Lubin Manufacturing Company and starring James Levering, Marguerite Ne Moyer, and Oliver Hardy.

== Plot ==
Old Bill Bowser is looking for love. He responds to a newspaper advertisement seeking a wealthy old man to marry a beautiful young widow. It turns out to be a scam: when the two meet, the woman demands a diamond engagement ring, and takes all of Bill's money to purchase it; at which point her husband comes in and scares Bill half to death. Bill returns home a sadder but wiser man. The woman repents and sends the money back to Bill, suggesting that he use it to buy a tombstone.

== Cast ==
- Marguerite Ne Moyer as Bella Donna (billed as Margaret Ne Moyer)
- Oliver Hardy as Phil, her husband (billed as Babe Hardy)
- James Levering as Bill Bowser
- John A. Murphy as Jim Levison

== Production and reception ==
Never Too Old was filmed in Jacksonville, Florida, at the Jacksonville unit of the Lubin Manufacturing Company of Philadelphia, under the general supervision of Arthur Hotaling, and released by the General Film Company on September 1, 1914. It was written by Epes W. Sargent and directed by John A. Murphy. The film was a short split-reel comedy, lasting approximately 5 minutes, and sharing a single reel of film with a second, unrelated comedy, The Green Alarm, starring Billy Bowers, Oliver Hardy, and Raymond McKee. Both films were among a group of short comedies made by the Lubin company in 1914 and early 1915 that include the earliest screen appearances of Oliver Hardy.

The film received mixed reviews in the trade papers. The Bioscope wrote "The tale unfolded by this film is rather ingenious, but not quite sufficiently strong to enable the appending of many situations. Will serve well as a short length relief from dramatic items". The reviewer for Moving Picture World felt that "there are some very amusing incidents in this comedy", but the New York Dramatic Mirror dismissed it as a "slender and almost pointless farce".

== See also ==
- List of American films of 1914
