= The Green Alarm =

1914 American silent comedy film

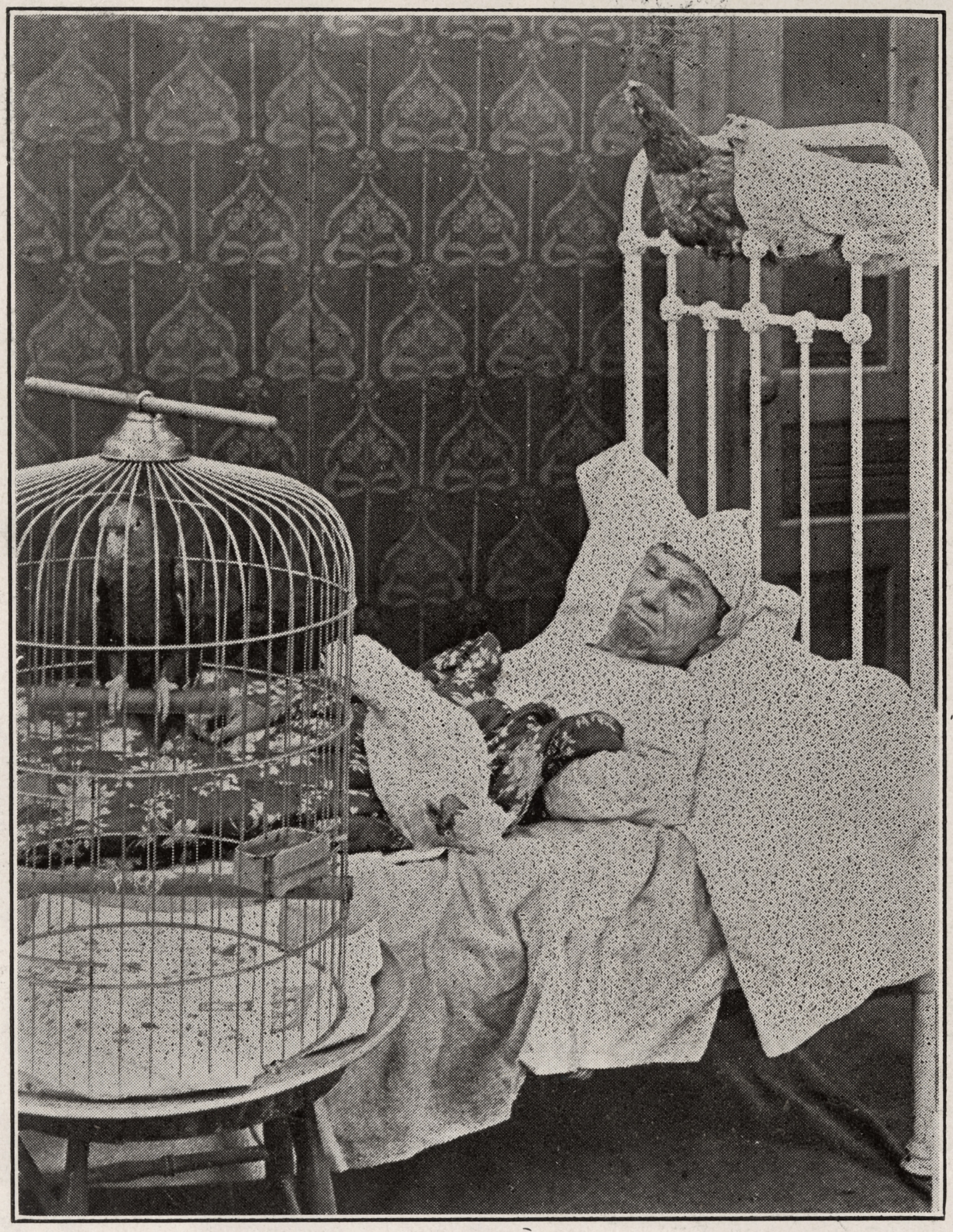
- Billy Bowers in a publicity still from The Green Alarm
- Directed by: Frank Griffin
- Written by: Frank Griffin
- Produced by: Arthur Hotaling
- Starring: Billy Bowers; Oliver Hardy; Raymond McKee
- Release date: September 1, 1914
- Running time: 6–7 minutes (c. 600 feet)
- Country: United States
- Languages: Silent film English intertitles

The Green Alarm is a 1914 American silent comedy film produced by the Lubin Manufacturing Company and starring Billy Bowers, Oliver Hardy, and Raymond McKee.

== Plot ==
Old man Hokus hangs the cage of his noisy parrot outside the window and goes to sleep. When Mike and Jake, two escaped convicts, come by and try to steal some of his chickens, they are spotted by the parrot, who raises a racket and wakes the old man. He runs out with his shotgun and traps the two thieves inside the chicken coop. The police are called and chase the thieves up onto the roof. They pelt the cops with bricks, but fall through the roof. After a fight Mike and Jake are apprehended and returned to jail, and old man Hokus goes back to bed, taking his parrot and his chickens with him.

== Cast ==
- Billy Bowers as Old Man Hokus
- Oliver Hardy as Mike (billed as O.N. Hardy)
- Raymond McKee as Jake
- Frank Griffin as Police Chief

== Production and reception ==
The Green Alarm was filmed in Jacksonville, Florida, at the Jacksonville unit of the Lubin Manufacturing Company of Philadelphia, under the general supervision of Arthur Hotaling. It was written and directed by Frank Griffin, and released by the General Film Company on September 1, 1914. The film was a short split-reel comedy, lasting approximately 7 minutes, and sharing a single reel of film with a second, unrelated comedy, Never Too Old, starring James Levering, Margaret Ne Moyer, and Oliver Hardy. The Green Alarm is one of a group of short comedies made by the Lubin company in 1914 that include the earliest screen appearances of Oliver Hardy, who is here paired with Raymond McKee, as he was in several other shorts made by the Lubin and Vim studios.

The film received mixed reviews in the trade papers. Moving Picture World described it as "a slap-stick, rough and tumble comedy" involving a chase with the cops "which causes some laughs". The New York Dramatic Mirror observed that "the introduction of the parrot in the capacity of an alarmist seems to be the one novel touch in a conventional burlesque". The reviewer for The Bioscope called the film a "a fast and furious comic", but noted that it "would have been quite sufficiently funny without the eccentric antics of the police".

== See also ==
- List of American films of 1914
- Oliver Hardy filmography
