= The Particular Cowboys =

1914 film

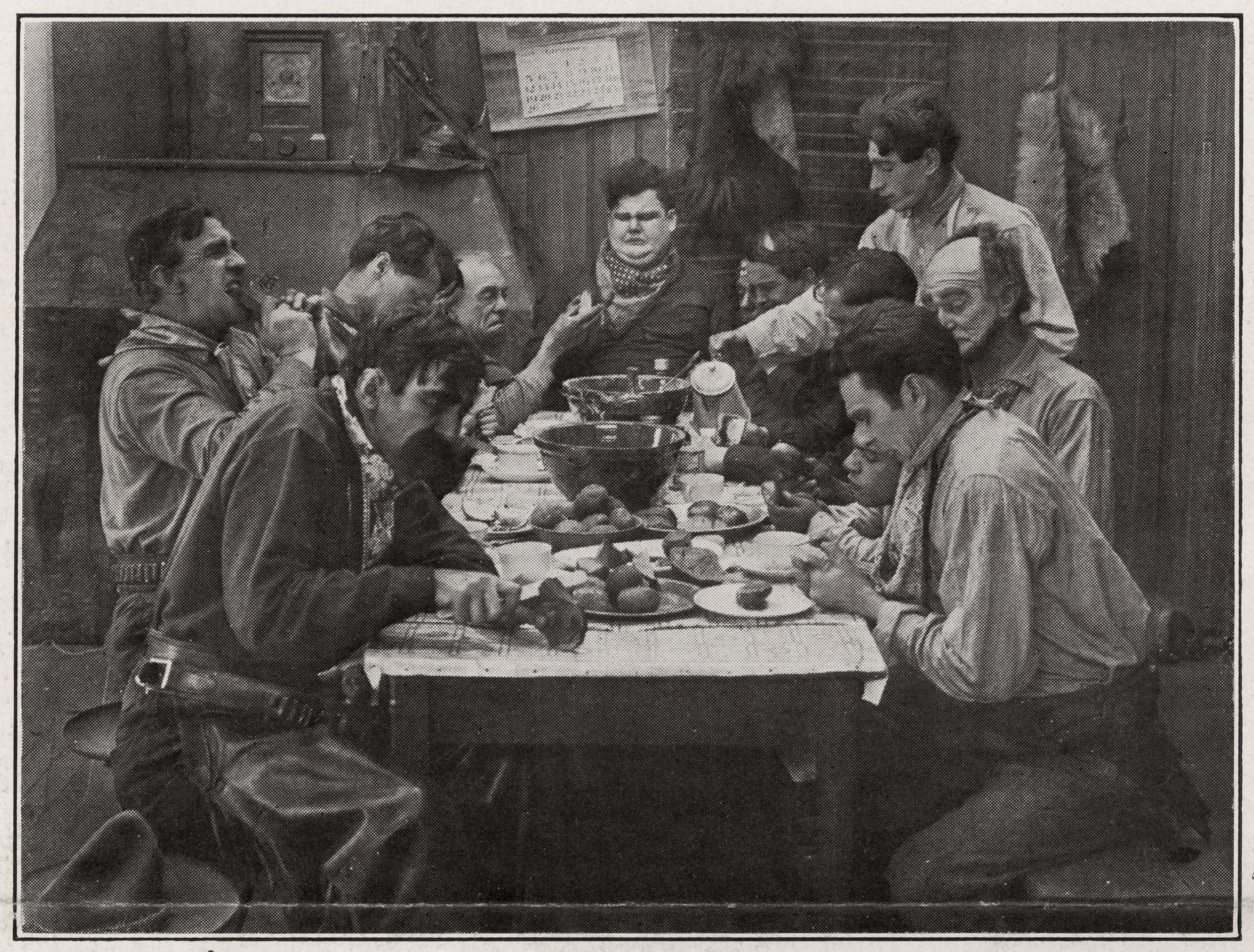
- Babe Hardy and the cast in a publicity still from The Particular Cowboys
- Directed by: Arthur Hotaling
- Written by: Epes W. Sargent
- Produced by: Arthur Hotaling
- Starring: Frances Ne Moyer; Raymond McKee
- Release date: May 26, 1914
- Running time: 5–6 minutes (c. 400 feet)
- Country: United States
- Languages: Silent film English intertitles

The Particular Cowboys is a lost 1914 American silent comedy film produced by the Lubin Manufacturing Company and starring Frances Ne Moyer and Raymond McKee. Also among the cast was Oliver Hardy, who had a small role as a cowboy.

== Plot ==
Jake hires Muriel, a pretty young woman, to cook for the cowboys at the ranch. Unfortunately, the food she prepares is inedible and the cowboys riot. Jake defends her honor by dressing up as Muriel, serving the dinner himself, and thrashing any cowboy who complains. When the cowboys discover the trick and find Jake and Muriel embracing, they debate whether to kill Jake or merely tar-and-feather him. Just then the ranch boss arrives with a Chinese cook, "and it all ends gloriously and everyone is satisfied".

== Cast ==
- Frances Ne Moyer as Muriel, the cook
- Raymond McKee as Jake, the chief cowboy
- Ben Walker as Bill, the terrier
- Oliver Hardy as a cowboy (uncredited)

== Production and reception ==
The Particular Cowboys was filmed in Jacksonville, Florida, at the Jacksonville unit of the Lubin Manufacturing Company, under the supervision of Arthur Hotaling. It was a very short split-reel comedy, lasting approximately 5–6 minutes, and sharing a single reel of film with a second, unrelated comedy, For Two Pins, featuring Jimmy Hodges, Marguerite Ne Moyer, and Raymond McKee. The films were released by the General Film Company on May 26, 1914.

Both The Particular Cowboys and For Two Pins are among the several Lubin split-reel comedies made in the spring of 1914 that include the earliest screen appearances of Oliver Hardy. In most of these films he was an uncredited extra playing one of a group of cops or, as here, a cowboy. Although the film itself does not survive, Hardy can be seen seated at the head of the table in a promotional still printed in The Lubin Bulletin, the studio's advertising newsletter.

The film received mixed reviews: Moving Picture World wrote "The laughs that are won by this half-reel of Lubin comedy will result from one or two bits of genuinely funny 'business' introduced. The excuse for the action can scarcely be held strong enough to justify all that is done by a bunch of wild and wooly Westerners who are dissatisfied with their ranch cook"; but The New York Dramatic Mirror had a more favorable impression: "Rough and ready laughter that spends itself at general good situations and laughable particulars is what makes this short slapstick comedy as good as has been turned out of the Hotaling laughter laboratory in recent times".

== See also ==
- List of American films of 1914
- Oliver Hardy filmography
