= Kidnapped (1917 film) =

1917 silent film directed by Alan Crosland

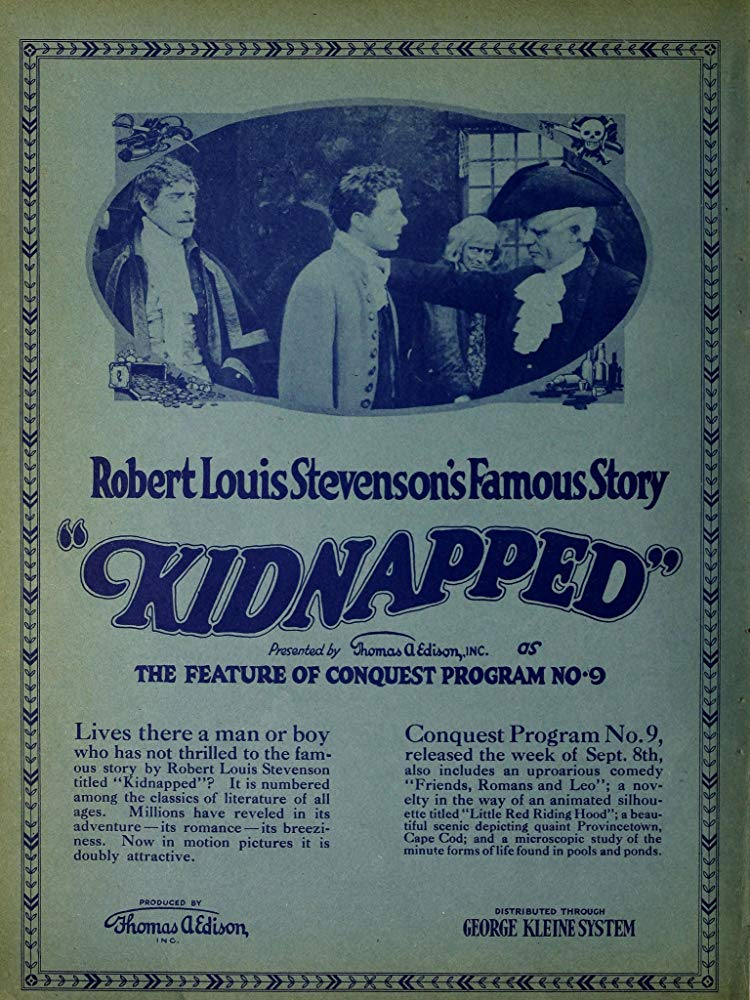
- Directed by: Alan Crosland
- Written by: Charles Sumner Williams (scenario)
- Based on: Kidnapped; 1886 novel by Robert Louis Stevenson
- Starring: Raymond McKee; Joseph Burke; Ray Hallor
- Production company: Edison Studios
- Distributed by: Forum Films, Inc.
- Release date: May 7, 1917
- Running time: 64 minutes
- Country: United States
- Language: Silent (English intertitles)

Kidnapped (1917)

Kidnapped is a 1917 American silent adventure film directed by Alan Crosland for Edison Studios. It was based on the 1886 novel Kidnapped by Robert Louis Stevenson. The film only included selected parts of the story, and reinforced the then-developing romanticisation of the Scottish Highlands.

Previously thought lost, a copy of the film is preserved in the Library of Congress collection, with a 2017 DVD of the film being released with the help of the Library of Congress and crowdfunding.

== Cast ==
- Raymond McKee as David Balfour
- Joseph Burke as Ebenezer Balfour
- Ray Hallor as Ransome
- William Wadsworth as Angus Ban Keillor
- Robert Cain as Alan Breck
- Walter Craven as Riach
- John Nicholson as Shuan
- Franklyn Hanna as Captain Hoseason (*Franklin Farnum)
- Samuel N. Niblack as Cluny McPherson (*as Samuel Niblack)
- Horace Haine as Colin Campbell (*as Horace Hane)
- James Levering as Minister
