= Capturing Bad Bill =

1915 film

- Written by: Epes W. Sargent
- Produced by: Arthur Hotaling
- Starring: Raymond McKee
- Release date: June 15, 1915
- Country: United States
- Languages: Silent film English intertitles

Capturing Bad Bill is a 1915 American silent comedy film featuring Oliver Hardy. It was a half-reel short, made by Lubin Studios in Jacksonville, Florida. The Moving Picture World described the film as "without novelty", but appreciated Raymond McKee's comic performance.

== Cast ==
- Raymond McKee as Pete Pepper
- Mabel Paige as Mary Pepper
- Ben Walker as The Mayor
- Oliver Hardy as Member of the posse (as Babe Hardy)

== See also ==
- List of American films of 1915
- Oliver Hardy filmography
