= Philip Tannura =

American cinematographer (1897–1973)

- Born: March 28, 1897; New York City, U.S.
- Died: December 7, 1973 (aged 76); Beverly Hills, California, U.S.
- Occupation: Cinematographer
- Years active: 1917–1967

Philip Tannura (March 28, 1897 – December 7, 1973) was an American cinematographer who worked on over a hundred films during his career. Tannura also directed and acted in several short films and worked on a number of Three Stooges shorts as cinematographer.

Tannura spent much of his career making mid to low-budget films for the Hollywood studios. In the early 1930s, he went to London to work in the British film industry. He was able to work on more expensive, quality productions during these years including several films produced by the Hungarian-born tycoon Max Schach. Following the outbreak of the Second World War in Europe, he returned to America. In 1941, he was cinematographer for the Rita Hayworth and Fred Astaire musical You'll Never Get Rich. Generally much of his later work, often at Columbia Pictures, was on film series such as the Lone Wolf and The Whistler. From the early 1950s, to the end of his career, he worked in television.

== Selected filmography ==
- The Little Chevalier (1917)
- The Apple Tree Girl (1917)
- Some Pun'kins (1925)
- Bred in Old Kentucky (1926)
- Sweet Adeline (1926)
- Legionnaires in Paris (1927)
- Jake the Plumber (1927)
- Her Summer Hero (1928)
- His Last Haul (1928)
- The Matinee Idol (1928)
- Taxi 13 (1928)
- Dead Man's Curve (1928)
- The Circus Kid (1928)
- Sally of the Scandals (1928)
- Lucky in Love (1929)
- Mother's Boy (1929)
- The Night of Decision (1931)
- Service for Ladies (1932)
- Ebb Tide (1932)
- Women Who Play (1932)
- Men of Tomorrow (1932)
- Channel Crossing (1933)
- Counsel's Opinion (1933)
- Lady in Danger (1934)
- Dirty Work (1934)
- Wild Boy (1934)
- A Cup of Kindness (1934)
- Fighting Stock (1935)
- Stormy Weather (1935)
- Moscow Nights (1935)
- Charing Cross Road (1935)
- Wolf's Clothing (1936)
- Southern Roses (1936)
- Dishonour Bright (1936)
- The Crimson Circle (1936)
- For Valour (1937)
- Love from a Stranger (1937)
- Make-Up (1937)
- Who's Your Lady Friend? (1937)
- School for Husbands (1937)
- Dinner at the Ritz (1937)
- Break the News (1938)
- Stolen Life (1939)
- Hell's Cargo (1939)
- Inspector Hornleigh (1939)
- Poison Pen (1939)
- Dreaming Out Loud (1940)
- Secrets of the Lone Wolf (1941)
- The Return of Daniel Boone (1941)
- You'll Never Get Rich (1941)
- Confessions of Boston Blackie (1941)
- Tillie the Toiler (1941)
- Counter-Espionage (1942)
- Two Yanks in Trinidad (1942)
- Dangerous Blondes (1943)
- She Has What It Takes (1943)
- The Town Went Wild (1944)
- Strange Illusion (1945)
- Prison Ship (1945)
- Night Editor (1946)
- The Man Who Dared (1946)
- Mysterious Intruder (1946)
- The Return of Rusty (1946)
- Just Before Dawn (1946)
- Key Witness (1947)
- The Millerson Case (1947)
- The Babe Ruth Story (1948)
- The Return of the Whistler (1948)
- The Lone Wolf and His Lady (1949)
- Shamrock Hill (1949)
- Customs Agent (1950)
- China Corsair (1951)
