= An Expensive Visit =

1915 film

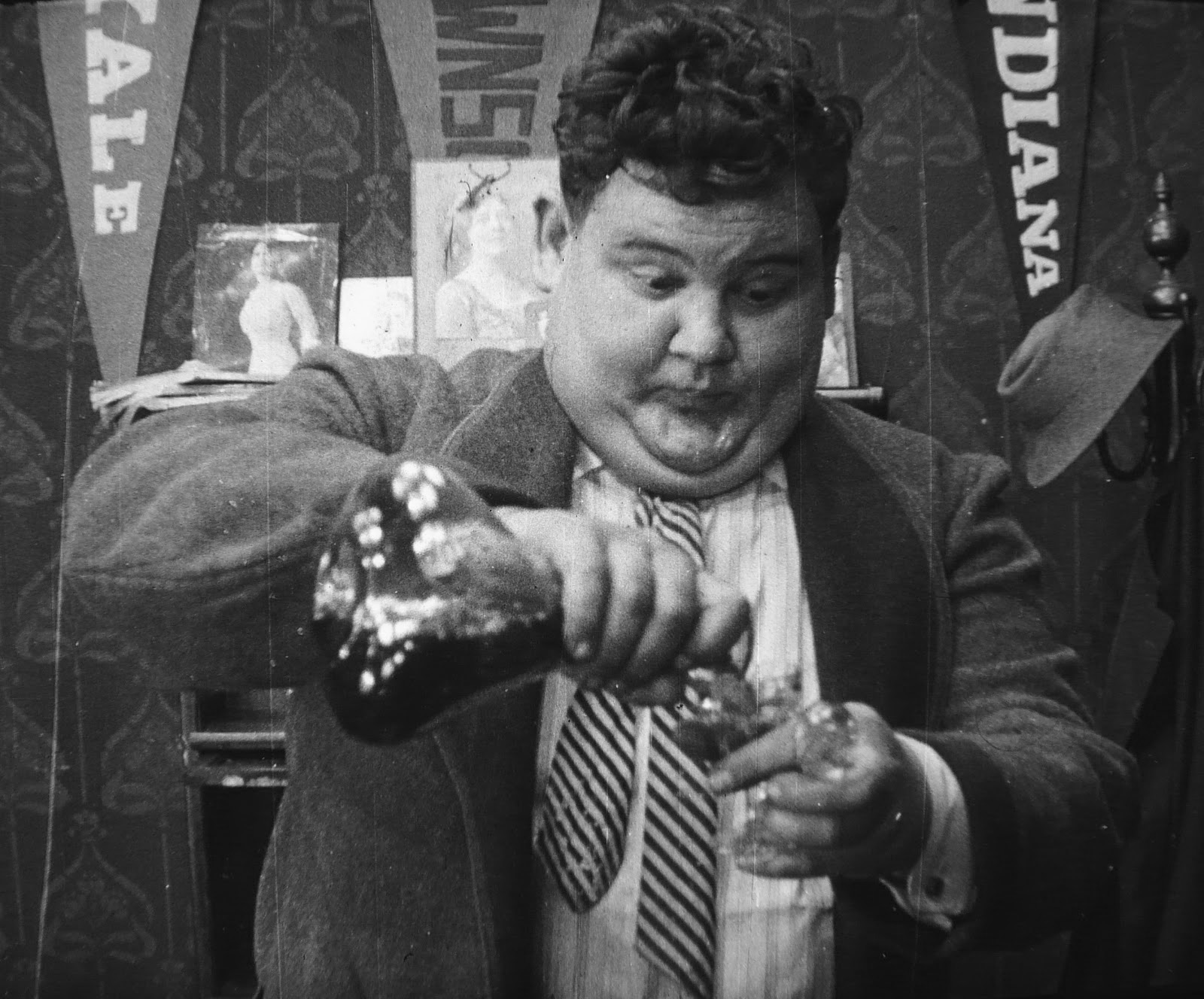
- Oliver Hardy in a scene from An Expensive Visit
- Directed by: Will Louis
- Written by: Edwin R. Coffin
- Produced by: Arthur Hotaling
- Starring: Ed Lawrence; Oliver Hardy; Raymond McKee; Ben Walker; Charles W. Ritchie
- Distributed by: General Film Company
- Release date: March 23, 1915
- Running time: c. 12 minutes (one reel)
- Country: United States
- Languages: Silent film English intertitles

An Expensive Visit (1915), from a nitrate print in the Library of Congress

An Expensive Visit is a 1915 American one-reel silent comedy film produced by the Lubin Manufacturing Company and starring Ed Lawrence, Oliver Hardy, Raymond McKee, Ben Walker, and C. W. Ritchie.

== Plot ==
Jack, a college boy, receives a message informing him that his allowance has been cut off and that his father is coming to see how he has been spending his money. Jack and his friends devise a scheme to embarrass his father. His friend Dick dresses as a woman and flirts with the father, who takes her out for an expensive dinner and sees her home afterward. As he tries to kiss her, Tom, another of Jack's friends, playing the role of the woman's jealous husband, enters and threatens the father with a gun. The father hands over all the money in his wallet and leaves town in a hurry, while the boys enjoy a night out at his expense.

== Cast ==
- Ed Lawrence as Dad
- Oliver Hardy as Jack
- Raymond McKee as Dick
- Ben Walker as Tom
- Charles W. Ritchie as Bill

== Production and reception ==
An Expensive Visit was written by Edwin Ray Coffin, directed by Will Lewis, and produced by Arthur Hotaling, the general supervisor of the Jacksonville, Florida unit of the Lubin Manufacturing Company of Philadelphia. It was released by the General Film Company on March 23, 1915, and was one of the last films produced by Lubin's Jacksonville unit, which had ceased operations on February 13, 1915. The short comedies made by the Lubin company in Florida in 1914 and early 1915 include the earliest screen appearances of Oliver Hardy.

The reviews of the film in the trade papers were positive. The New York Dramatic Mirror called it "an entertaining comedy", and The Bioscope described it as an "amusing, if somewhat long drawn-out comedy, in which three college lads, anxious to 'raise the wind,' play a decidedly laugnhable, but somewhat mean, trick on the old father". The critic for Moving Picture World wrote that it was "a well-turned one-reel comedy with the pranks of a number of college boys as the foundation of the fun. The spirit and humor put into the performance makes the film exceptionally amusing."

== Preservation and restoration ==
An Expensive Visit is one of the few Lubin comedies featuring Oliver Hardy to survive. It was long thought lost, until a nitrate print was acquired by the Library of Congress from a collector in Suffolk, England, in 2012. It was restored by the Library of Congress and Lobster Films from this unique print and released on the blu-ray set Laurel or Hardy: Early Solo Films of Stan Laurel and Oliver Hardy.

== See also ==
- List of American films of 1915
- Oliver Hardy filmography
