= Cannibal King =

1915 film

- Directed by: Frank Griffin
- Written by: Edwin R. Coffin
- Produced by: Arthur Hotaling
- Starring: Oliver Hardy
- Release date: July 6, 1915
- Country: United States
- Languages: Silent film English intertitles

Cannibal King is a July, 1915 American silent comedy film starring Oliver Hardy. It was shown on a split reel following a cartoon comedy called Ping Pong Woo. The copyright was registered at the Library of Congress under Ping Pong Woo.

== Plot ==
This plot was published in The New York Dramatic Mirror, July 14, 1915:

It depicts the efforts of one Willie to buy his girl a birthday present, and being engaged as "super" in a motion picture in the making. Then his rival exceeds all rules by being allowed to bring the girl as a visitor, which causes the Cannibal King—Willie—to make a dash for liberty. In seeking refuge he scares all passers-by, and soon has the police on his trail. Escaped, he scares his rival away, and then proposes.

== Cast ==
- Oliver Hardy as Willie (as Babe Hardy)
- Frances Ne Moyer as Grace
- Harry Lorraine as Her father
- J. Frank Glendon as Fred
- Frank Griffin as Motion Picture Director (as Frank C. Griffin)

== See also ==
- List of American films of 1915
- Oliver Hardy filmography
