= They Looked Alike =

1915 film

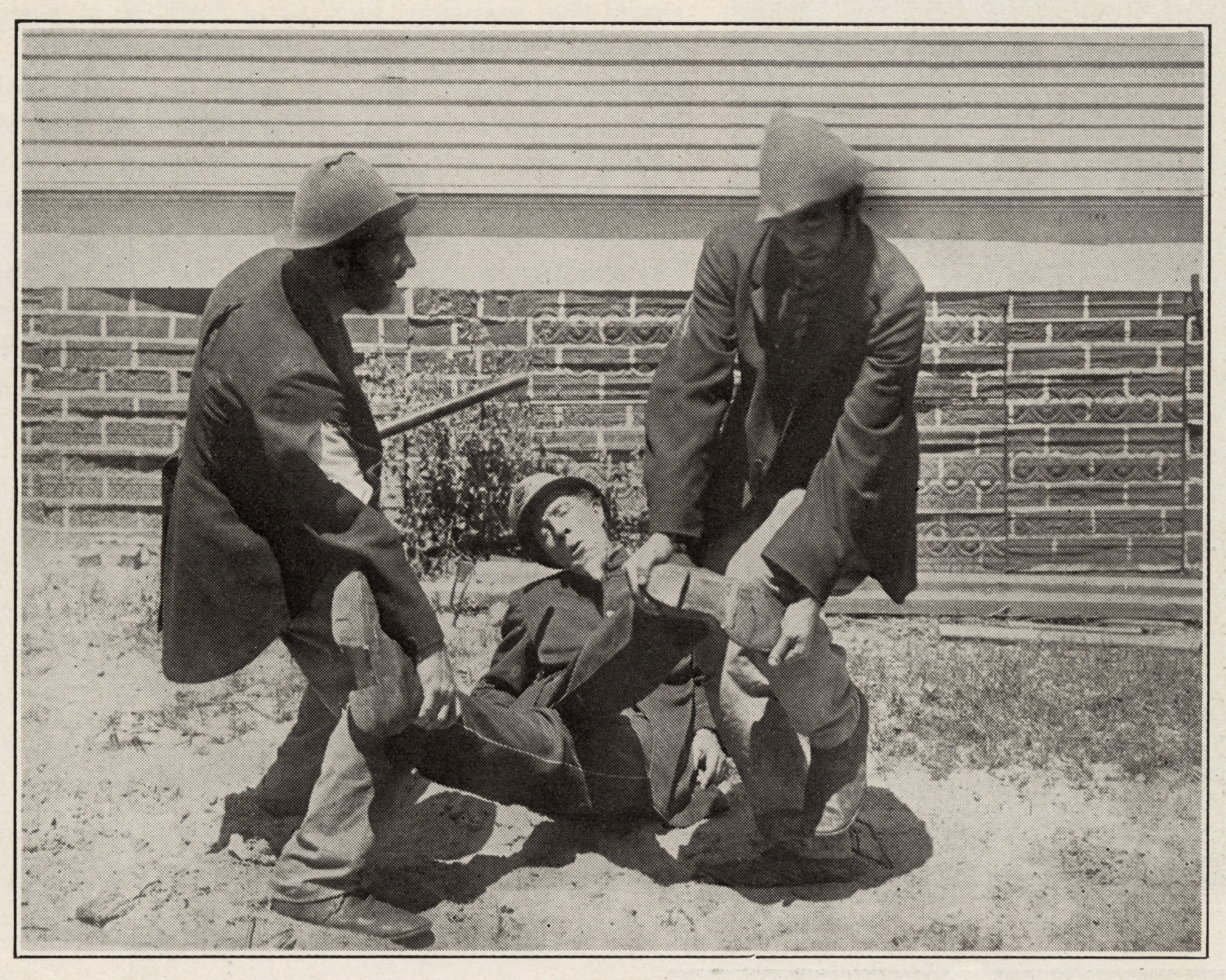
- C. W. Ritchie and Raymond McKee in a publicity still from They Looked Alike
- Directed by: Frank Griffin
- Written by: Epes W. Sargent
- Produced by: Arthur Hotaling; Siegmund Lubin
- Starring: C.W. Ritchie
- Distributed by: General Film Company
- Release date: January 5, 1915
- Running time: split reel
- Country: United States
- Languages: Silent film English intertitles

They Looked Alike is a 1915 American silent short comedy film featuring Oliver Hardy.

== Plot ==
According to a film magazine, "Bill and Sam are two tramps and they look so much alike that they fool the Riverside cops completely. Rube, the champion sprinter of the force, is coaxed to chase Bill and not knowing that there are two, keeps after his victim while the tramps work relays and run him off his feet. This rouses the ire of his brother officers and they start out to avenge him. They run across Sam foraging and give chase. Sam runs to the shack where he left Bill and is relieved. They might have been running yet had not the owner of the shack locked the door. This enables the cops to capture Sam, and Bill is discovered in the shed. The owner of the place lends them a light wagon and the two tramps are forced to play horse and drag the weary policemen back to the station house, where they are made to run the gauntlet into the cells, to the delight of Rube."

== Cast ==
- C. W. Ritchie as Bill
- Raymond McKee as Sam
- Harry Lorraine as Cop
- Oliver Hardy as Pedestrian (as Babe Hardy)

== See also ==
- List of American films of 1915
- Oliver Hardy filmography
