= Poor Baby =

1915 film

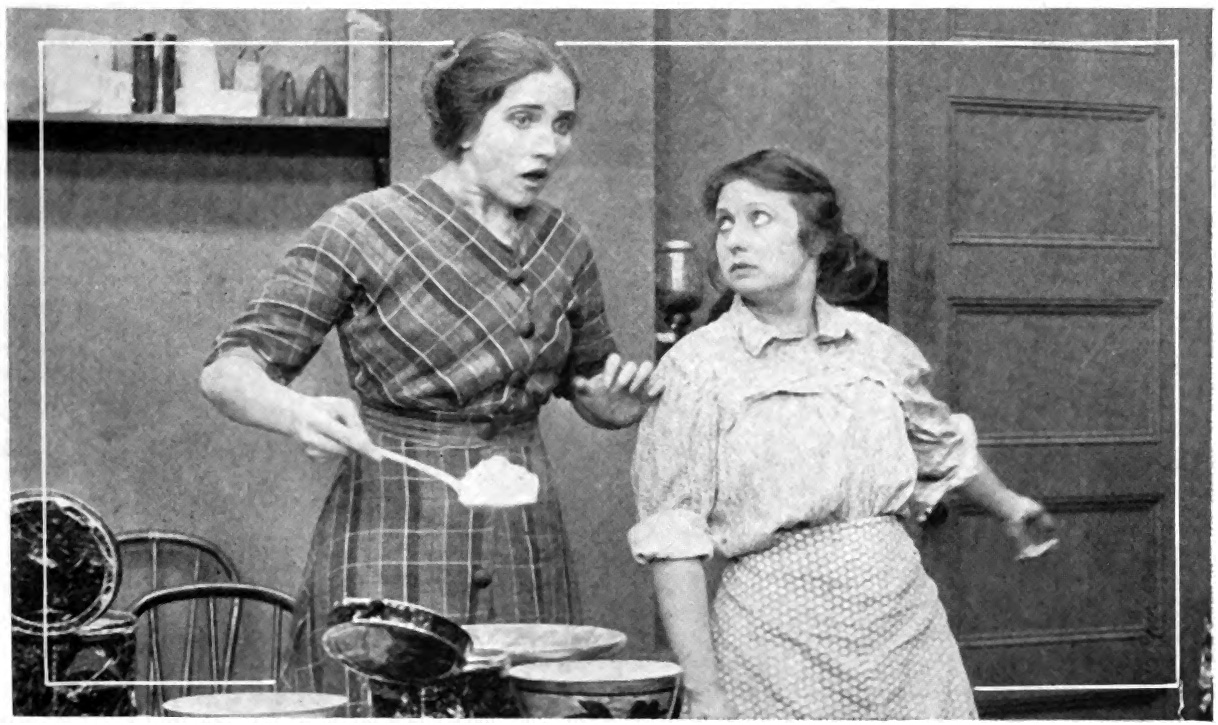
- Promotional still from Poor Baby
- Directed by: Will Louis
- Written by: Elizabeth Miller
- Starring: Raymond McKee
- Release date: July 28, 1915
- Country: United States
- Languages: Silent film English intertitles

Poor Baby is a 1915 American silent comedy film starring Raymond McKee and featuring Oliver Hardy in a bit role.

== Cast ==
- Raymond McKee as Pete, a tramp
- Lucille Allen as Mrs. Smith
- Lou Gorey as Mrs. Jones
- Leonora Van Benschoten as Margy, her baby
- Guido Colucci as Paul Jones
- Alice Grey as Servant girl
- Harry Eytinge as The Sheriff
- Andy Clark as Tommy (as Andrew J. Clark)
- Caroline Rankin as Matilda Jenkins
- Oliver Hardy as Matilda's sweetheart (as O.N. Hardy)

== See also ==
- List of American films of 1915
- Oliver Hardy filmography
