= The Apple Tree Girl =

1917 American silent drama film

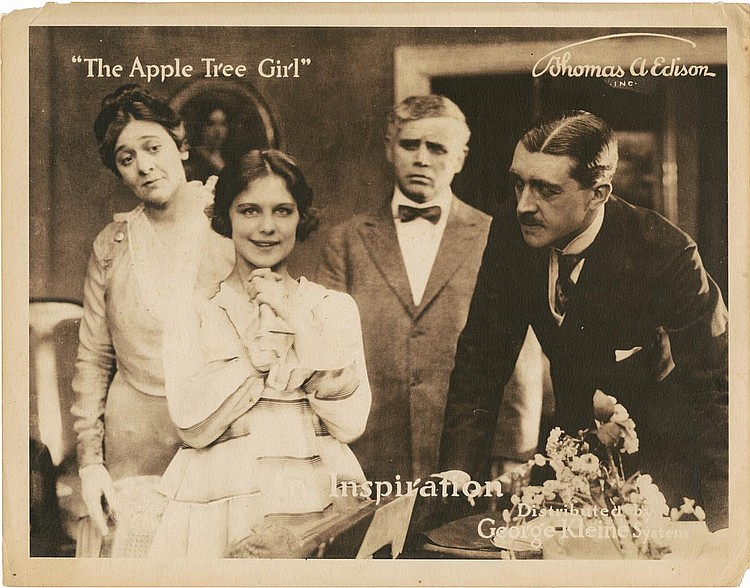
- Directed by: Alan Crosland
- Written by: E. Clement D'Art
- Starring: Shirley Mason; Raymond McKee; Jessie Stevens
- Cinematography: Philip Tannura
- Production company: Edison Studios
- Distributed by: K-E-S-E Service
- Release date: October 1, 1917
- Country: United States
- Languages: Silent; English intertitles

The Apple Tree Girl or The Apple-Tree Girl is a 1917 American silent drama film directed by Alan Crosland and starring Shirley Mason, Raymond McKee and Jessie Stevens.

== Plot ==
Charlotte Marlin grew up on a farm in Connecticut near Micah's apple tree, which was said to have turned from pale green to spotted red when a peddler was buried under it. After losing her parents, Charlotte moves in with her aunt and cousin Margaret, who is considered attractive. She befriends Neil Kennedy, a hardworking college student from a modest background. Despite her academic achievements, Charlotte feels overshadowed by Margaret's popularity and leading role in a school play. Driven by jealousy, Charlotte sets out to win everyone's favor, achieve fame, and marry a millionaire.

In her quest to be liked by all, Charlotte adopts a friendly demeanor towards everyone she encounters. In her pursuit of fame, she takes up golf and eventually becomes the champion of a prestigious tournament. However, when she accidentally injures wealthy Perry Graham with a golf ball and cares for him during his recovery, she realizes her true feelings lie with Neil, who has now become a promising doctor.

== Cast ==
- Shirley Mason as Charlotte Marlin
- Joyce Fair as Margaret Pennington
- Jessie Stevens as Ma'me Bazin
- Raymond McKee as Neil Kennedy
- Edward Coleman as Willis Hayland
- Mabel Guilford as Lady Standish
- Graham Doubble as Bannister Hughes
- Harry Hollingsworth as Perry Graham
- Andy Clark as Peter
- Mabel Strickland as Grace Pennington
- William Wadsworth as Philip Pennington

== Bibliography ==
- Goble, Alan. The Complete Index to Literary Sources in Film. Walter de Gruyter, 1999.
