= When the Ham Turned =

1914 film

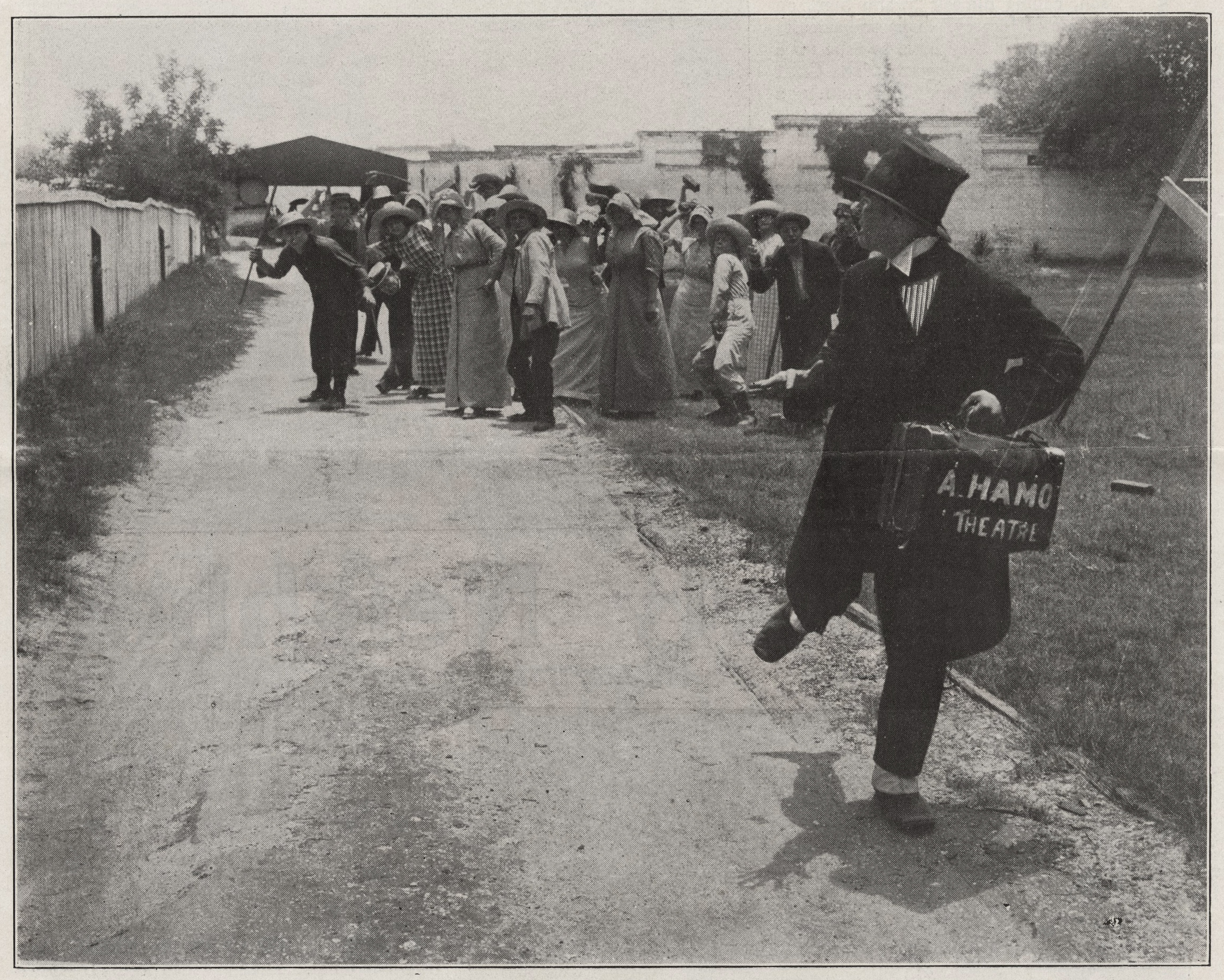
- Raymond McKee and the cast in a publicity still from When the Ham Turned
- Directed by: Frank Griffin
- Written by: Arthur Hotaling
- Produced by: Siegmund Lubin
- Starring: Raymond McKee
- Release date: October 10, 1914
- Running time: c. 10 minutes (1000 ft)
- Country: United States
- Languages: Silent film English intertitles

When the Ham Turned is a 1914 American silent comedy film produced by the Lubin Manufacturing Company and starring Raymond McKee, C. W. Ritchie, Ed Lawrence, and Oliver Hardy.

== Plot ==
After being driven out of town by a mob, the actor A. Hamo arrives in another town where he has previously performed. He is recognized by the police, who arrest him, beat him, and put him in a cell. After his release, Hamo sneaks back, ties the police chief to a tree, and steals his uniform. Impersonating the chief, he wreaks havoc in a bar, and is pursued by the bartender and the mayor. Hamo drenches the uniform in whiskey, puts it back on the chief, and drags him down the road. He is treated as a hero for capturing the old chief and the mayor appoints him the new chief of police.

== Cast ==
- Raymond McKee as A. Hamo
- C. W. Ritchie as Police Chief
- Ed Lawrence as The Mayor
- Oliver Hardy as The Bartender (billed as Babe Hardy)

== Production and reception ==
When the Ham Turned was directed by Frank Griffin and produced in Jacksonville, Florida, at the Jacksonville unit of the Lubin Manufacturing Company of Philadelphia, under the general supervision of Arthur Hotaling, who also wrote the story. It was released by the General Film Company on October 10, 1914. The film was one of a group of short comedies made by the Lubin company in 1914 and early 1915 that include the earliest screen appearances of Oliver Hardy.

The film received generally favorable reviews in the trade papers. The New York Dramatic Mirror wrote "A rough and tumble burlesque from start to finish, this film is as amusing as the average of its type." The critic for The Bioscope praised McKee's performance in particular: "As the disgusted but infinitely resourceful thespian, Mr. Raymond McKee has a grand opportunity, the result of which is an uproarious issue." Motion Picture News described it as "a rather amusing comedy", while Moving Picture World wrote "Any one that is fond of seeing boisterous, rough-and-tumble comedies can certainly have their appetites satiated, as this is one of the old fashioned acrobatic pictures. There are some of the ridiculous scenes that gain laughter. The caricature make-ups and the repetition of scenes disgust rather than amuse." Variety described it as "a fair laugh getter", but added that the "principals need more coaching in comedy work".

== See also ==
- List of American films of 1914
- Oliver Hardy filmography
