= Not Much Force =

1915 film

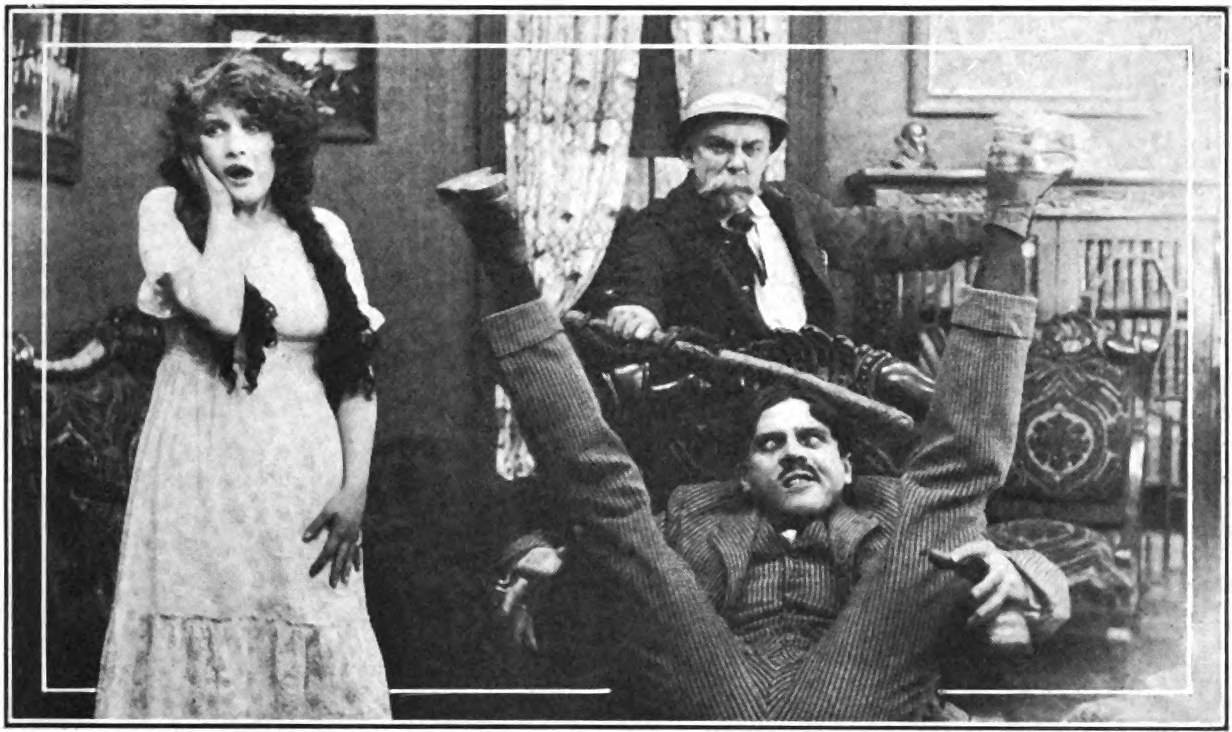
- Prootional still from Not Much Force, featuring Raymond McKee (lower right), Jean Dumar (left), and Julian Reed (upper right)
- Directed by: Will Louis
- Written by: William W. Pratt
- Starring: Julian Reed
- Release date: August 4, 1915
- Country: United States
- Languages: Silent film English intertitles

Not Much Force is a 1915 American silent comedy film featuring Oliver Hardy.

== Plot ==
This plot summary comes from Motion Picture News for August 14, 1915:

A rural police comedy. The chief's wife is finally appointed policewoman, and makes the chief scrub the floor of the jail while she mounts [watches] guard.

This longer version appeared in The Moving Picture World for August 7, 1915. Note that acquiring a "bun" meant getting drunk.

O'Toole is the only cop in his home town. When he is not shining up his badge, he is sleuthing around frying to make a real, dyed-in-the-wool arrest. But after failing to land a burglar who enters the house of a member of the town council, O'Toole is warned that unless he manages to arrest the next burglar who turns up he will have !p hand over his over-polished badge to another. Young Pat McNat is in love with O'Toole's daughter, Mabel, but is ordered away from the house. Now, however, O'Toole gets an idea. He will promise Pat the hand of his daughter if Pat will dress as a burglar, wearing a mask, and allow himself to be captured by the redoubtable O'Toole just as he is engaged in "robbing" the house of Malinda Sprinks, an old maid. Pat is game, and agrees to be on hand, costumed as per instructions, at the appointed hour.

But on the way home O'Toole acquires a "bun" at the saloon, and on getting to his house goes straight to bed. That night, after his wife has retired, the telephone rings. Miss Sprinks is on the wire; a burglar is in her house! Mrs. O'Toole tries her best to wake hubby, but he is dead to the world; so she dresses herself and puts on O'Toole's coat and hat. Swinging his club, she takes Pat, in his burglar make-up straight off to the jail and locks him up. Returning home, she goes to bed, after returning hubby's hat, coat and stick. Two hours later a real burglar comes to Malinda's house, and again she calls up the police department. This time he answers the call himself and, quickly dressing, goes off to "arrest" Pat, as per arrangement. But he finds that this burglar is the real thing. When the burglar objects to being arrested, O'Toole gives him a flve-dollar bill, telling him to stick to his bargain and come quietly. He takes the burglar off and puts him in the cell next to Pat. Next morning, as he is explaining how he made the arrest, his wife enters and tells her story. The committee investigates the affair and as a result, O'Toole is given a chance to do some "clean-up" work in criminal circles in the shape of a job scrubbing the floor of the jail. His wife is appointed in his place and told that, henceforth, she may do the badge polishing in that town. Pat, released, hastens to wed Mabel, with her mother's sanction.

== Cast ==
- Julian Reed as Sarsfield O'Toole
- Lou Gorey as Mrs. O'Toole
- Jean Dumar as Mabel O'Toole
- Raymond McKee as Pat McNat
- Dallas Welford as A Burglar
- Oliver Hardy as City Councilman (as O.N. Hardy)
- Caroline Rankin as Malinda

== See also ==
- List of American films of 1915
- Oliver Hardy filmography
