= Gringoire =

Gringoire can refer to:

- Pierre Gringoire
- Gringoire (newspaper) a French newspaper between 1928 and 1944
