= Cohen's Luck =

1915 silent film

- Directed by: John H. Collins
- Written by: Lee Arthur (play)
- Starring: William Wadsworth; Lillian Devere; Viola Dana
- Production company: Edison Pictures
- Distributed by: General Film Company
- Release date: June 11, 1915
- Running time: 50 minutes
- Country: United States
- Languages: Silent; English intertitles

Cohen's Luck is a 1915 American silent comedy film directed by John H. Collins and starring William Wadsworth, Lillian Devere and Viola Dana.

== Cast ==
- William Wadsworth as Abe Cohen
- Lillian Devere as Cohen's Wife
- Viola Dana as Minnie Cohen
- Harry Scherr as Abe Cohen Jr.
- Duncan McRae as Sam Blumenthal
- Johnnie Walker as David Moss
- Jessie Stevens as Mrs. Kitty McGee
- Edward Lawrence as Timothy Murphy
- Frank A. Lyons as Steve O'Rourke
- Henry Leone as Laskey

== Bibliography ==
- Langman, Larry. American Film Cycles: The Silent Era. Greenwood Publishing, 1998.
