= Barry Pain =

British writer (1864–1928)

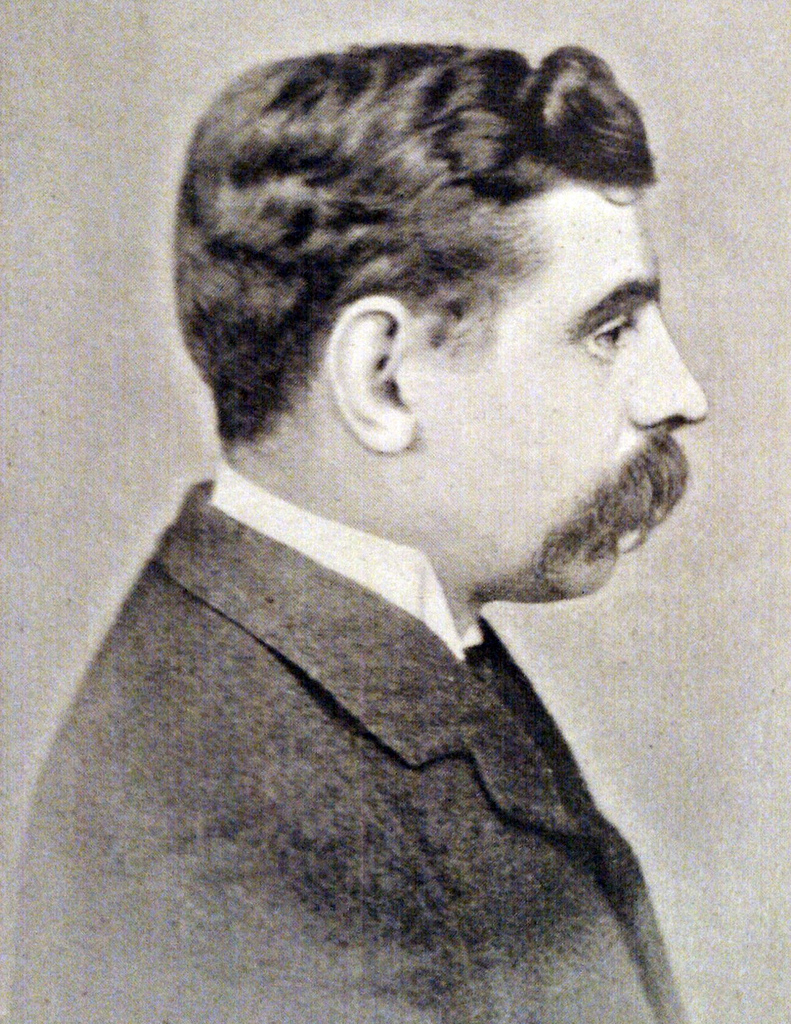
- Born: 28 September 1864; Cambridge
- Died: 5 May 1928 (aged 63)

Barry Eric Odell Pain (28 September 1864 – 5 May 1928) was an English journalist, poet, humorist and writer.

== Biography ==
Barry Odell Pain was born to the working class couple Maria and John Odell Pain on September 28, 1864. Later, the socio-economic circumstance of his birth helped fit him comfortably into the group of "new humour" writers that emerged in the 1890s, none of the other members of which was university educated. Pain was the first author the title of "new humourist" was bestowed upon (or, as he might have said, was shackled with). However, although Barry's father was a linen draper he still was able to send his son to Sedbergh School from 1879 to 1883, where Barry wrote for the school magazine. After Sedbergh, Pain matriculated at Corpus Christi College, Cambridge in 1883, and he won a scholarship there in 1884. Pain left Cambridge in 1886, having earned a third class B.A. in classics, and became a prominent contributor to The Granta.

Upon graduating, Pain served as an “usher” (a secondary school master) at a school in Surrey before resigning in 1888 to become a coach for the army exam at Guildford. Neither job pleased Pain, and while coaching he wrote for the undergraduate magazine The Granta. In 1889, Cornhill Magazine's editor, James Payn, published his story "The Hundred Gates", and in 1890 Pain moved to London where he became a contributor to Punch and The Speaker, and joined the staffs of the Daily Chronicle and Black and White. Pain supposedly "owes his discovery to Robert Louis Stevenson, who compares him to De Maupassant". From 1896 to 1928 he was a regular contributor to The Windsor Magazine. The year Pain moved to London his first book—In a Canadian Canoe, the Nine Muses Minus One, and Other Stories—was published in "The Whitefriar's Library of Wit and Humour." Although the book consisted largely of revised versions of stories he had previously written for The Granta, it was quite well received. A Punch critic deemed it “not only witty and humorous, but fresh and original in style." However, in a Longman's Magazine article titled “The New Humour” Andrew Lang claimed, among other things, that Pain's sort of humor could appeal only to “deeply corrupted sensibilities.”

Nevertheless, the term "new humour" gradually joined other "new" concepts of the time, such as the new journalism, new woman, and new drama, and became a positive description of the humorous writings of working class writers such as Jerome K. Jerome, Israel Zangwill, W.W. Jacobs, and William Pett Ridge. These new humourists used common language, wrote about working class and lower class London, and avoided classical allusions, French quotations or esoteric references that would be part of higher education.

Pain's writing was diverse, including lightly humorous tales such as "The Eliza Stories," parody, satire, a theological study, cockney dialect poems, school stories, and fantasy/thrillers. Today, Pain is best known for his spine-tinglers such as Stories in the Dark, Here and Hereafter, and Not on the Passenger List. However, during his lifetime Pain was best known for his humor. Monty Python member Terry Jones has called "The Eliza Stories" "some of the funniest books in the English language," and he connects the narrator of those stories directly to Basil Fawlty, "as exasperating and infuriating as he is funny."

Pain died in Bushey, Hertfordshire in May 1928 after a lengthy illness and is buried in Bushey churchyard.

Pain's works include :

- In a Canadian Canoe (1891), papers reprinted from The Granta;
- Playthings and Parodies (1892);
- The Redemption of Gerald Rosecourt (Serialised, Illustrated London News, 1892);
- Stories And Interludes (1892);
- Graeme And Cyril (1893), published as 'Two' in United States;
- The Kindness of the Celestial (1894);
- The Octave of Claudius (1897);
- The Romantic History of Robin Hood (1898);
- Wilmay and Other Stories of Women (1898);
- Eliza (1900);
- Another English Woman's Love Letters (1901);
- Stories in the Dark (1901);
- De Omnibus, by the Conductor (1901);
- City Chronicles (1901);
- Nothing Serious (1901);
- The One Before (1902);
- Eliza's Husband (1903);
- Little Entertainments (1903);
- Three Fantasies (1904);
- Curiosities (1904);
- Deals (1904);
- Lindley Kays (1904);
- The Memoirs of Constantine Dix (1905);
- Robinson Crusoe's Return (1906);
- Wilhelmina in London (1906);
- The Shadow of the Unseen with James Blyth (1907);
- The Diary of a Baby (1907);
- The Luck of Norman Dale with James Blyth (1908);
- First Lessons in Story-writing (1908);
- Proofs Before Pulping (1909);
- The Gifted Family (1909);
- The Exiles of Faloo (1910);
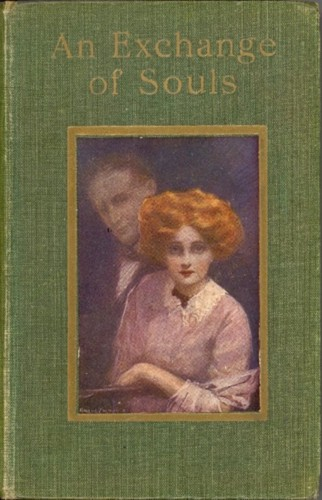
- An Exchange of Souls
  An Exchange of Souls (1911);
- Stories in Grey (1911);
- Here And Hereafter (1911);
- Eliza Getting On (1911);
- Stories Without Tears (1912);
- Exit Eliza (1912);
- Mr. Malding's Progress promotional story/booklet for Berlitz Schools of Languages (1912);
- Mrs Murphy (1913);
- The Mountain Apart (under the pseudonym James Prosper) (1913);
- Eliza's Son (1913);
- The New Gulliver (1913);
- One Kind And Another (1914);
- The Short Story (1914);
- Futurist Fifteen (1914);
- Edwards (1915);
- Me And Harris (1916);
- Collected Tales (1916);
- Confessions of Alphonse (1917);
- Innocent Amusements (1918);
- Says Mrs Hicks ( circa 1918);
- The Problem Club (1919);
- The Death of Maurice (1920);
- Marge Askinforit (1920);
- Going Home (1921)
- If Summer Don't (1921) (United Kingdom) / If Winter Don't (United States) - a parody of the bestseller novel If Winter Comes;
- Tamplin's Tales of His Family (1924);
- This Charming Green Hat Fair (1925);
- Essays of Today And Yesterday (1926);
- The Later Years (1927);
- Dumphry (1927)

Stories Barry Told Me by his daughter, Eva (Mrs T.L. Eckersley) was published in 1927.

Stories in the Dark and Stories in Grey contain several of Pain's horror stories. 'Dark' contains the famous "The Moon-Slave".

Alfred Noyes was a friend of Pain's and for several summers they were near neighbours at Rottingdean. In Noyes' autobiography, one of the longest chapters is devoted to Pain.

Noyes particularly admired Pain's novel The Exiles of Faloo, of which he writes: "It is the story of an island in the Pacific, to which a number of scoundrels of various kinds, together with other men not entirely scoundrels but broken by the law, had escaped 'beyond the law's pursuing.' They establish a Club, with rules designed for the circumstances, one of which naturally was that no credit should be given. Gradually, through the original flaws in character, the society ends disastrously in conflict with the native population. There is humour and heroism, beauty and tragedy in the tale and, like all great stories, it is a parable".

An Exchange of Souls is credited with being inspirational to H. P. Lovecraft, specifically in his short story "The Thing on the Doorstep".

In 2006, Hippocampus Press re-published An Exchange of Souls together with Henri Béraud's Lazarus.

=== Adaptations ===
- In 1992 BBC2 adapted twelve of the stories from Eliza as "Life With Eliza", a series of 10-minute Edwardian comic monologues, featuring Sue Roderick as Eliza and John Sessions as her husband.
- In 2006 Eliza was serialised by BBC Radio 4.
