= The Little Chevalier =

1917 film

- Directed by: Alan Crosland
- Written by: E. Clement D'Art; Mary Evelyn Moore Davis (novel)
- Starring: Shirley Mason; Raymond McKee; Richard Tucker
- Cinematography: Philip Tannura
- Production company: Edison Studios
- Distributed by: K-E-S-E Service
- Release date: August 11, 1917
- Country: United States
- Languages: Silent; English intertitles

The Little Chevalier is a 1917 American silent historical drama film directed by Alan Crosland and starring Shirley Mason, Raymond McKee and Richard Tucker.

== Plot ==
A duel in France in which the Chevalier de la Roche kills the Vicomte de Valdeterre, results in an ongoing feud between the two families. Years later, in New Orleans, Valdeterre's son Henri arranges a duel with the son of the Chevalier de la Roche, known as the Little Chevalier. Overwhelmed at the swordsmanship of the Little Chevalier, Henri faints and, upon regaining consciousness, leaves the de la Roche estate. Later, at a ball held at the governor's mansion, Henri meets Diane, the daughter of the late Chevalier and, smitten, begins to court her. This arouses the jealousy of Delaup, who is the governor's secretary and an ardent suitor of Diane's. Delaup discovers a royal proclamation sent to Henri, granting him the power to seize the de la Roche estate, and attempts to use the document to force Diane to marry him. In response, Diane sends for Henri, and when he arrives, he finds the Little Chevalier waiting to duel. Henri refuses to fight so the Little Chevalier removing his cloak to reveal that they are Diane. The long term feud between the two families is then ended with Diane and Henri's marriage.

== Cast ==
- Shirley Mason as The Little Chevalier / Diane de la Roche
- Raymond McKee as Henri Valdeterre
- Richard Tucker as Delaup
- Joseph Burke as Chapron
- William Wadsworth as Dominick

== Bibliography ==
- Goble, Alan. The Complete Index to Literary Sources in Film. Walter de Gruyter, 1999.
