= Frank Griffin (director) =

American film director

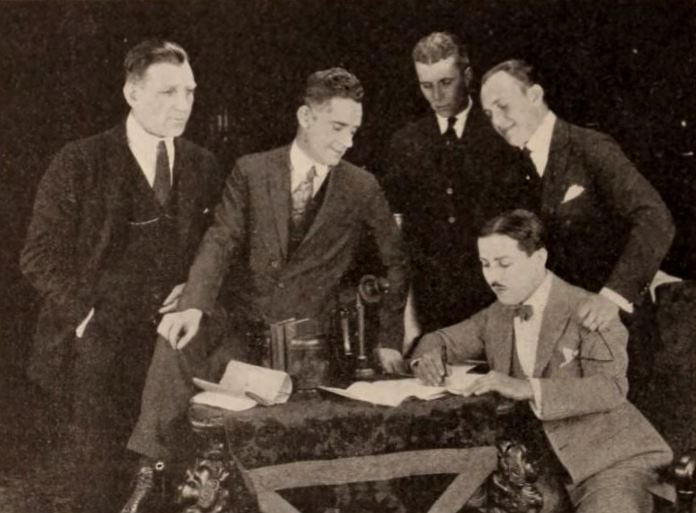
- For the signing of Monty Banks with Warner Bros., Frank Griffin was second from the left
- Born: September 17, 1886; Norfolk, Virginia, US
- Died: March 17, 1953 (aged 66); Los Angeles, California, US
- Occupation(s): Film director and writer
- Years active: 1914–1929

Frank Griffin (September 17, 1886 – March 17, 1953) was an American film director, writer, and actor of the silent era. He directed 29 films between 1914 and 1924. He was born in Norfolk, Virginia, and died in Los Angeles, California from a heart attack.

== Selected filmography ==
- A Brewerytown Romance (1914)
- The Kidnapped Bride (1914)
- Worms Will Turn (1914)
- The Green Alarm (1914)
- A Fool There Was (1914)
- Pins Are Lucky (1914)
- When the Ham Turned (1914)
- The Honor of the Force (1914)
- Dobs at the Shore (1914)
- They Looked Alike (1915)
- Cannibal King (1915)
- Where Love Leads (1916)
- The King of the Kitchen (1918)
- Lions and Ladies (1919)
- Her First Kiss (1919)

== Preservation ==
Griffin's film Her First Kiss was preserved by the Academy Film Archive, in conjunction with 20th Century Fox, in 2013.
