= The Simp and the Sophomores =

1915 film

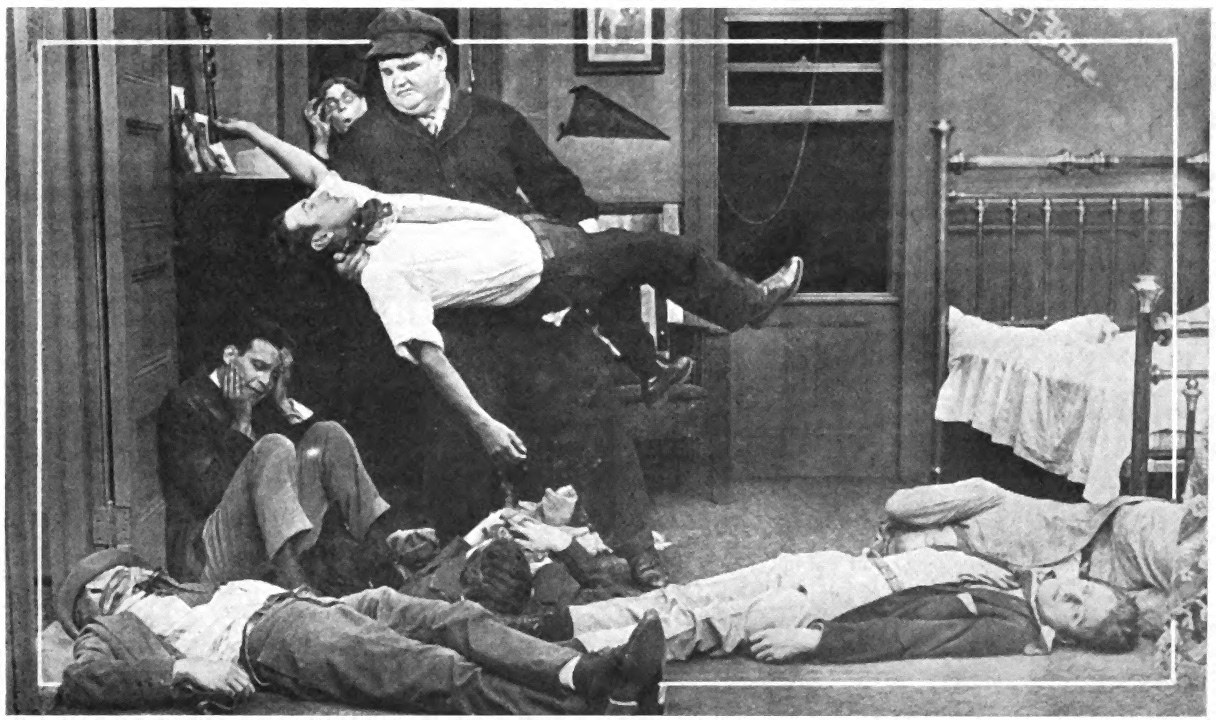
- Promotional still from The Simp and the Sophomores, with Oliver Hardy (standing, left)
- Directed by: Will Louis
- Written by: Eldon Raymond
- Starring: Raymond McKee
- Release date: September 1, 1915
- Country: United States
- Languages: Silent film English intertitles

The Simp and the Sophomores is a 1915 silent comedy film featuring Oliver Hardy.

== Plot ==
This plot summary comes from The Moving Picture World for September 4, 1915:

Percy Quince enters the co-ed academy of Prof. Stout. The professor shows Alice Fields, one of the girl students, a letter from Percy's mother, warning him against allowing Percy to enter Into any contests of strength, as he is, the note says, "so strong that he may injure the other boys." Alice tells the girls and boys, and when Percy finally does show up, they see that he lives up to his name, and is far from being a future "white hope." Led by Tom Haze, they immediately proceed to make him wish he were dead, and put him through all sorts of Indignities. He will beat them at their own game, if he can. By so doing, he argues, he will win the admiration of Alice, who has called him a "simp." A day or two later he Is told by the boys that they wish to make him a member of the Hylumpus Debating Club. When he accepts, he is told that the committee of the club will visit him in his room at midnight, and that he must be prepared. Suspecting more abuse at the hands of the "committee," he decides that this is the time to strike back.

In a newspaper he has read the advertisement of Professor Armstrong, an exponent of the art of self-defense. He goes to the professor's establishment and "fixes it" with him to come to the academy that night and i occupy his bed. At midnight, several dark figures mount the stairway to Percy's room. They are surprised to find that he is not up and waiting for them. On the contrary, snores come from the direction of the bed. As one man, they spring upon the bed and commence to pound the "sleeping" figure. Then the boxing piofessor starts in. Percy, concealed in the clothes closet, listens delightedly to the agonized howls emitted by the badly beaten "committee." Finally the "pug" throws the boys out bodily, and a little later he leaves the building, after having been paid by Percy.

Next morning a sad-looking procession wends its way out of the school hospital. Percy, now believed by all of them to be "some scrapper," is seated in the shade of a tree, making, for the first time, a real "hit" with Alice, who has learned of the night's adventure.

== Cast ==
- Raymond McKee – Percy Quince
- Harry Eytinge – Professor Stout
- Arthur Housman – Tom Haze
- Oliver Hardy – Professor Arm. Strong (as O.N. Hardy)
- Jean Dumar – Alice Fields

== See also ==
- List of American films of 1915
- Oliver Hardy filmography
