= Billy and the Big Stick =

1917 silent film

- Directed by: Edward H. Griffith
- Written by: Richard Harding Davis; Wallace M. Woody
- Starring: Raymond McKee; Yona Landowska; William Wadsworth
- Production company: Edison Studios
- Distributed by: K-E-S-E Service
- Release date: July 28, 1917
- Running time: 50 minutes
- Country: United States
- Languages: Silent; English intertitles

Billy and the Big Stick is a 1917 American silent comedy drama film directed by Edward H. Griffith and starring Raymond McKee, Yona Landowska and William Wadsworth.

== Cast ==
- Raymond McKee as Billy Barlow
- Yona Landowska as Claire Ducrot
- William Wadsworth as President Hamilcar Poussevain
- Jessie Stevens as Widow Ducrot
- Bradley Barker as Harry St. Clair
- Joseph Burke as Monsieur Paillard

== Bibliography ==
- Robert B. Connelly. The Silents: Silent Feature Films, 1910-36, Volume 40, Issue 2. December Press, 1998.
