= Henri Béraud =

French novelist and journalist

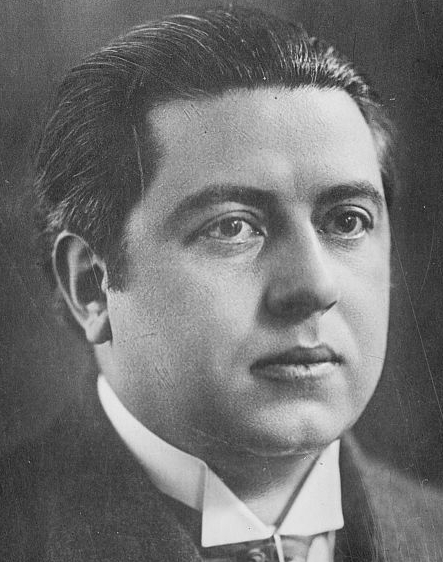
Henri Béraud

Henri Béraud (French pronunciation: [ɑ̃ʁi beʁo]; 21 September 1885 in Lyon – 24 October 1958 in Saint-Clément-des-Baleines, Ré Island), also known as Tristan Audebert, was a French novelist and journalist. He was sentenced to death in 1945, which was later commuted to life imprisonment, for collaboration with Germany.

== Life ==
Henri Béraud was the son of a baker. In 1903 he began his work in journalism. He joined the satirical weekly Le Canard enchaîné in February 1917, recommended by Paul Vaillant-Couturier, and Roland Dorgeles. He renewed his old friendship with Albert Londres.

He later became known as one of France's best-selling novelists and reporters, and won the Prix Goncourt in 1922. He was virulently Anglophobic and to a lesser extent antisemitic. These factors led him to support Vichy France. He did this by contributing pieces to the fascist weekly paper Gringoire, indicating his hatred of British forces and criticism of the Free French.

Typical of Vichy anti-British propaganda was the widely distributed pamphlet published in August 1940 and written by self-proclaimed "professional Anglophobe" Henri Béraud entitled, Faut-il réduire l'Angleterre en esclavage? ("Should England Be Reduced to Slavery?"); the question in the title was merely rhetorical. Additionally, Vichy mixed Anglophobia with racism and antisemitism to portray the British as a racially degenerate "mixed race" working for Jewish capitalists, in contrast to the "racially pure" peoples on the continent of Europe who were building a "New Order".

His aid of the Vichy government caused him to be sentenced to death in 1945, but several writers, including François Mauriac intervened on his behalf. The sentence was commuted by Charles de Gaulle to life imprisonment. By 1950, he was freed for health reasons. He died eight years later.

== Works ==
- L'École moderne de peinture lyonnaise (1912)
- Le Vitriol de Lune (1921, prix Goncourt 1922)
- Le Martyre de l'obèse, (prix Goncourt 1922)
- Lazarus, Albin Michel, 1924 (re-published in 2006 by Hippocampus Press together with An Exchange of Souls by Barry Pain, ed.S. T. Joshi)
- Ce que j'ai vu à Moscou, Les Éditions de France 1925
- Le Bois du templier pendu, Les Éditions de France, 1926
- Ce que j'ai vu à Berlin, Les Éditions de France, 1926
- La Gerbe d'or, Les Éditions de France, (1928)
- Route Cavalière de la Solitude, Lapina, (1928)
- Ce que j'ai vu à Rome, Les Éditions de France, 1929
- Qu’as-tu fait de ta jeunesse? (1941)
- Les Lurons de Sabolas (1932)
- Ciel de suie (1933)
- Faut-il réduire l'Angleterre en esclavage (1935)
- Les raisons d'un silence, Inter-France, 1944
- Les derniers beaux jours, Plon, 1953
- Portraits de contemporains
- Retour sentimental vers Alphonse Daudet, 2001
- Écrits dans Gringoire (1928–1937), 2003
- Au Capucin Gourmand
- Le Flâneur salarié
- "Rendez-vous européens, Les Éditions de France, 1928
