= A Brewerytown Romance =

1914 film

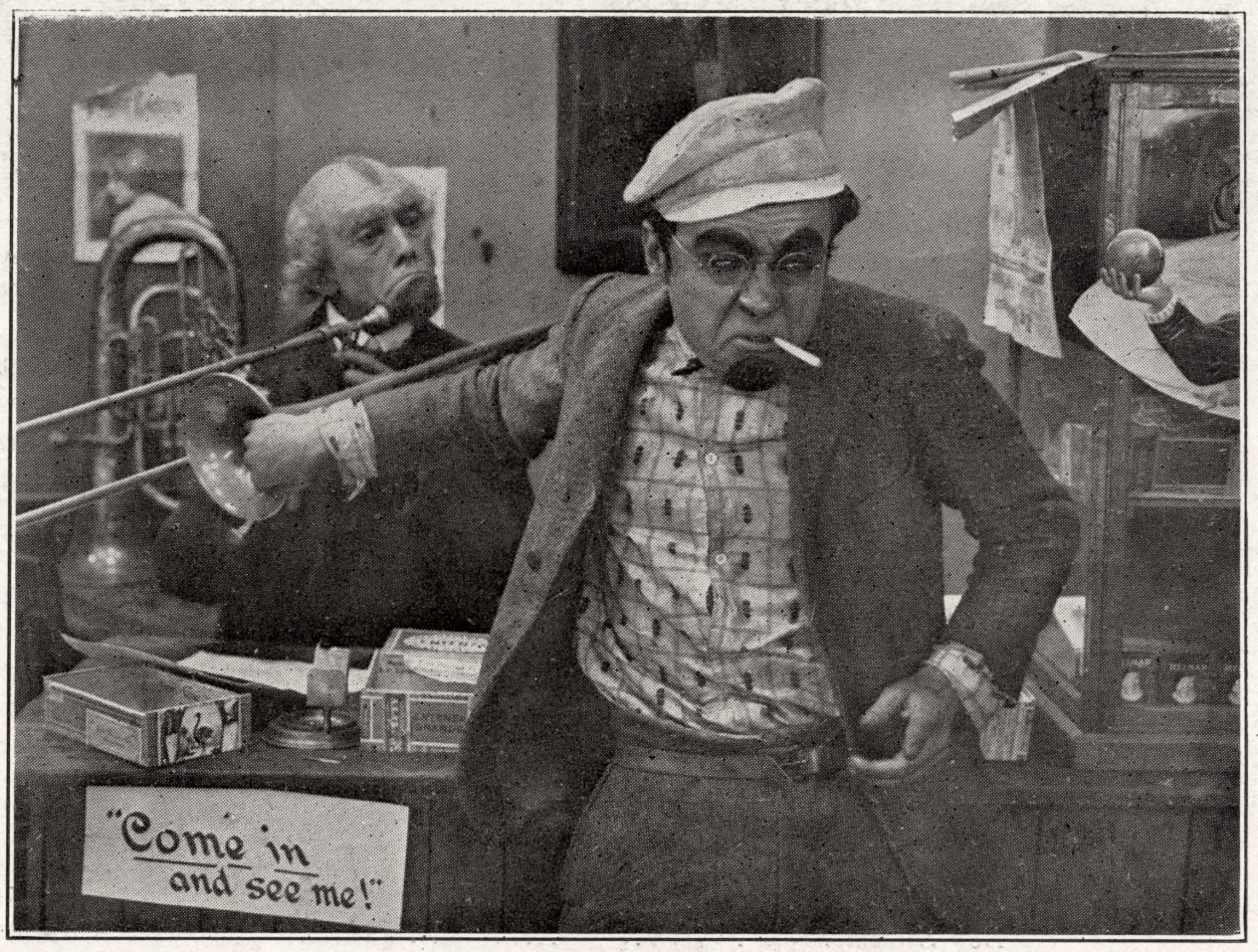
- Raymond McKee in a publicity still from A Brewerytown Romance
- Directed by: Frank Griffin
- Written by: Frank Griffin
- Produced by: Arthur Hotaling
- Starring: Eva Bell; Raymond McKee; Frank Griffin; Oliver Hardy
- Release date: June 2, 1914
- Running time: 7–8 minutes (c. 600 feet)
- Country: United States
- Languages: Silent film English intertitles

A Brewerytown Romance is a lost 1914 American silent comedy film produced by the Lubin Manufacturing Company, starring Eva Bell, Raymond McKee, Frank Griffin, and Oliver Hardy.

== Plot ==
Lena's jealous boyfriend Emil is furious when Lena dances with Heinz, the local tango champion. Emil pulls a gun and chases Heinz, who dives into a river and swims to a nearby boat in order to escape. But the boat is loaded with nitroglycerine, and when Emil shoots at it, it explodes, blowing Heinz into the air. He falls on top of Emil, and the two men continue to fight until they are stopped up by Cassidy, the cop, who happens to be Lena's old sweetheart. When Lena is given an ultimatum and forced to choose between Emil and Heinz, she chooses Cassidy instead, and the couple push Emil and Heinz into the river.

== Cast ==
- Eva Bell as Lena Krautheimer
- Raymond McKee as Emil Schweitzer
- Frank Griffin as Tango Heinz (as Frank C. Griffin)
- Oliver Hardy as Cassidy (as Babe Hardy)

== Production ==
A Brewerytown Romance was filmed in Jacksonville, Florida, at the Jacksonville unit of the Lubin Manufacturing Company, under the supervision of Arthur Hotaling. It was a short split-reel comedy, lasting approximately 7–8 minutes, and sharing a single reel of film with a second, unrelated comedy, Summer Love, which featured Eloise Willard, Edward Lawrence, Frances Ne Moyer, and Jimmy Hodges. The films were released by the General Film Company on June 2, 1914. Both were written and directed by Frank Griffin, who went on to direct several other short comedies for Lubin in 1914 and 1915. A sequel to A Brewerytown Romance, entitled The Kidnapped Bride and featuring the same cast and characters, was released a month later.

A Brewerytown Romance is one of several films made in the spring of 1914 that include the earliest screen appearances of Oliver Hardy. In most of these films he was an uncredited extra, but in a A Brewerytown Romance he played a small but important role and was identified by name in the film's credits and in studio advertisements. This was Hardy's first screen appearance under the nickname "Babe" Hardy; in his only previous screen credit, in the Lubin comedy Outwitting Dad, released several weeks earlier, he was listed as O. N. Hardy.

Like most of the earliest Lubin shorts, A Brewerytown Romance does not survive. It is assumed that the negatives and original prints perished in the disastrous explosion and fire that destroyed the Lubin film vault in Philadelphia, Pennsylvania, on June 13, 1914.

== Reception ==
The reviews of the film in the trade papers were tepid at best. The New York Dramatic Mirror wrote, "Characterized à la Ford Sterling, in the burlesque of the German characters, and with the slapstick element reigning supreme, the offering starts where the rival insults the man, and the rest of the half reel is a chase not noteworthy for anything more than the blowing up of an old boat. The usual rough and tumble acrobatics accompany it. The characters are all made up as Teutons, all except the policeman." According to The Moving Picture World, "there is nothing to praise and much in the way of detail to condemn in this alleged comedy on the same reel with Summer Love. One of the funny(?) things offered is a chase in which the principal comedian shows great fear of losing his trousers — incidentally, he shows considerable shirt-tail." The Motion Picture News, on the other hand, was more positive: "This comedy would signify that Lubin has taken up the slapstick and facial expression variety of comedy. The story is that of the two rivals for the same girl and the chase, brick throwing and other accompaniments are sidesplitting."

== See also ==
- List of American films of 1914
- Oliver Hardy filmography
