= A Blind Bargain =

1922 film by Wallace Worsley

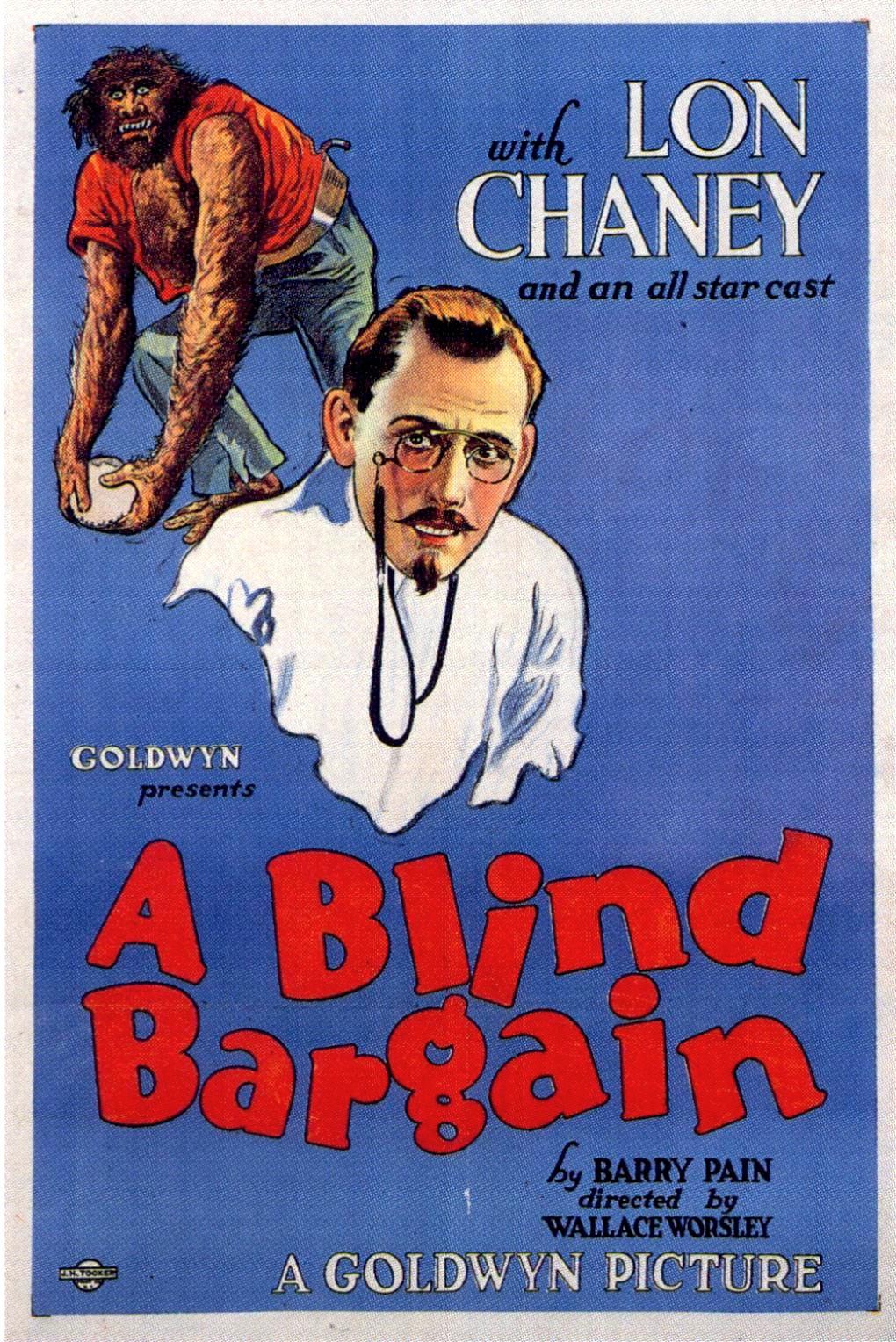
- Wallace Beery (background) and Lon Chaney, on the original, 1922 theatrical poster
- Directed by: Wallace Worsley
- Written by: J.G. Hawks
- Based on: The Octave of Claudius by Barry Pain
- Produced by: Samuel Goldwyn
- Starring: Lon Chaney; Raymond McKee; Jacqueline Logan; Virginia True Boardman; Fontaine La Rue
- Cinematography: Norbert Brodine
- Edited by: Paul Bern
- Music by: J. Bercovitch (cue sheet)
- Distributed by: Goldwyn Pictures
- Release dates: December 3, 1922 (premiere); December 10, 1922 (United States)
- Running time: 57 minutes (5 reels)
- Country: United States
- Language: Silent (English intertitles)

A Blind Bargain is a 1922 American silent horror film starring Lon Chaney and Raymond McKee, released through Goldwyn Pictures. The film was directed by Wallace Worsley and is based on Barry Pain's 1897 novel The Octave of Claudius. Lon Chaney played a dual role in the film, as both Dr. Lamb and "the Ape Man", one of Chaney's few "true horror films". The claim that Wallace Beery appeared as an ape-man uncredited has never been proven, but does persist in many sources.

Although the film was finished in November 1921, it was only released in December 1922. This delay was due to problems with the censors, as the film's theme dealt with doctors creating artificial life and attempting to play God. The film was cut from six reels to five in the process, and the title cards had to be rewritten four times. The film is now considered lost and remains today one of the most sought after lost films of Lon Chaney's career. A lobby card from the film exists on the internet, as well as a photo of Chaney in the Ape Man makeup.

== Plot ==
The film is a contemporary 1920s picture (though the book was published in 1897) that takes place in New York City. The story involves a mad scientist who forces a man who is down on his luck to enter into an agreement to become a willing subject of the doctor's weird experiments, knowing full well that the result will be the loss of his humanity.

Robert Sandell, despondent over his failure as a writer and his mother's declining health, attempts to rob a theatergoer, Dr. Lamb, a sinister, fanatical physician living in the suburbs of New York. Lamb takes the boy to his home, learns his story, and agrees to perform an operation on Mrs. Sandell on one condition – that Robert shall, at the end of eight days time, deliver himself to the doctor to do with as he will for experimental purposes. Frantic with worry over his dying mother's condition, Robert blindly agrees to the bargain.

Mother and son take up their residence in the Lamb home, where Robert is closely watched, not only by the doctor, but also by his wife and a grotesque hunchback, whom Robert learns afterwards is the result of one of the doctor's first experiments.

Dr. Lamb, anxious to keep his hold over Robert, not only gives him spending money, but also assists him in having his book published through Wytcherly, the head of a publishing company. Robert meets Wytcherly's daughter Angela and promptly falls in love.

In the meantime, the days are slipping by to the time of the experiment. Robert has been warned by Mrs. Lamb and the hunchback that great danger threatens him. At dawn, they show him as a warning a mysterious underground vault which holds a complete operating room and a tunnel of cages in which are confined strange half-human prisoners – the previously failed experiments of Dr. Lamb's. In agony and fear, Robert pleads with the physician and tries to buy his way out of the bargain, for now that his book has been published, he is now a successful writer. Only one day remains before the time limit is up, but the doctor, realizing his victim is considering escaping, seizes him and straps him to the operating table. Robert is rescued by Mrs. Lamb, the hunchback releases one of the cage doors, and the doctor is himself brutally murdered at the hands of an ape-man who was destroyed mentally by the doctor's experiments.

Finally freed from the terms of his "blind bargain", Robert returns to his home to learn that his book has met with success and that Angela awaits him at the altar.

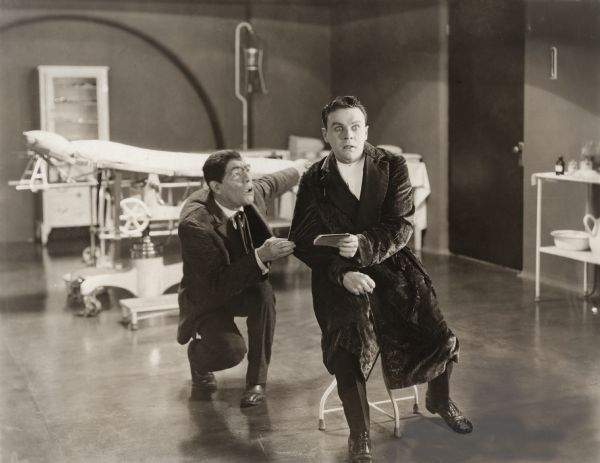
In a medical operating room, Robert Sandell (Raymond McKee) is shocked by what he has read in the notepad that the Ape Man (Lon Chaney) has given him.

== Cast ==
- Lon Chaney dual role as Dr. Arthur Lamb / The Ape Man
- Raymond McKee as Robert Sandell
- Jacqueline Logan as Angela Marshall
- Virginia True Boardman as Robert's mother
- Aggie Herring as Bessie
- Virginia Madison as Angela's Mother
- Fontaine La Rue as Mrs. Lamb
- Wallace Beery as a Beast man (uncredited cameo)

== Background and production ==
Based on Barry Pain's novel, The Octave of Claudius, A Blind Bargain tied together horrific elements for which Lon Chaney became so well known. His characterizations of both Dr. Lamb and the hunchback assistant showcased Chaney's talent for makeup. For the finale, the ape-man that is released upon Dr. Lamb was rumored to have been played by Wallace Beery, in an uncredited cameo performance.

== Release and reception ==
The film was premiered December 3, 1922, at the Capitol Theater in New York, and met with a standing ovation the opening night of the film. Critical response for the film was good, most praising Lon Chaney's dual performance as the mad doctor and his apish servant as being the highlight of the picture.

"It appears to have been the aim of all connected with this production to accent the weird, mysterious and uncanny elements and to make the picture so that it would thrill and fascinate spectators because of its horror and mystery ... Lon Chaney's work in this picture is really marvelous and he again demonstrates that he is one of the best, if not the very best, character actor on the screen. As the ape-man, his portrayal and likeness to a huge chimpanzee is wonderful and sends chills up and down your spine." —Moving Picture World

"Chaney, doubling as both the doctor and his hunchback, gives a creditable performance and allows for some double photography that is by no means unworthy of mention. Always at his best in a grotesque make-up, Chaney predominates in the character of the man-ape, using the ungainly lope of the supposed animal as a means of locomotion throughout the interpretation of the character." —Variety

"A theme that is thoroughly appropriate and suitable for Lon Chaney, providing him with two distinct roles in which he is given plenty of opportunities to live up to his reputation as "a man with a thousand faces"....Those who like his particular type of (grotesque) portrayal will find plenty to satisfy them." —Film Daily

"Mr. Chaney essays the dual role assigned to him with that fine assurance that marks all of his work. His make-up is of course wonderful and one marvels at the contrast between the Doctor with his erect and distinguished carriage and the deformed little man victimized by the surgical experiments." —Exhibitors Trade Review

"As the doctor, Chaney is not so good. Lon as a grotesque mistake of nature is far more thrilling than Lon in a frock coat and a vandyke beard. There are many thrills – illogical perhaps, but now and then breath taking." —Photoplay

== Preservation and technical specifications ==
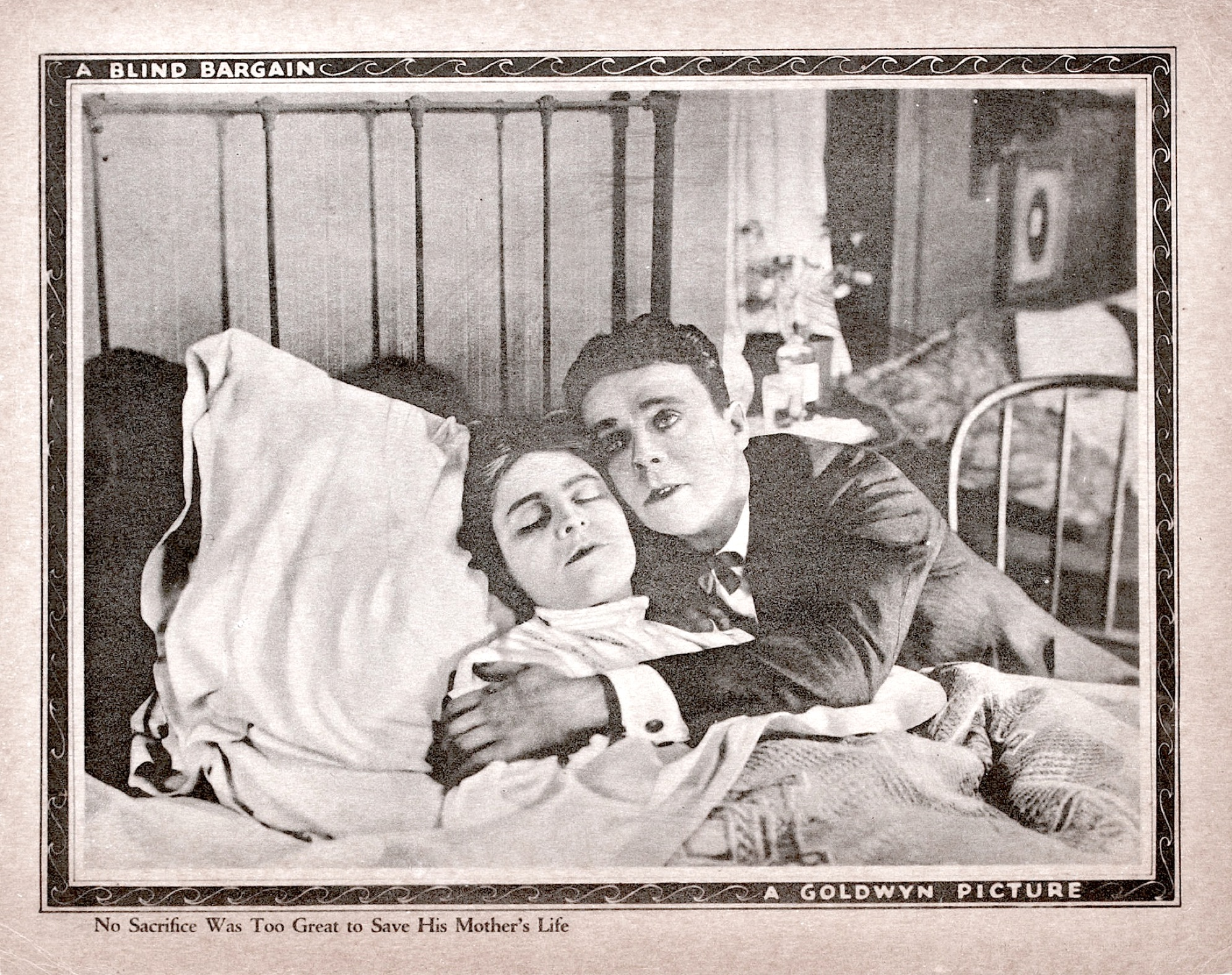
A lobby card for the film, depicting Raymond McKee as the main character, with his mother

Today, the film is considered lost. The original negative was destroyed in 1931 by MGM several years after the takeover of Goldwyn Studios, and the last surviving print is believed to have perished in the same 1965 fire in Vault #7 that also destroyed the last known prints of London After Midnight and a number of other Lon Chaney films.

The footage count in the film was 4,152 feet (1,266 m). The film was tinted and toned various colors, including blue tone/flesh tint, blue tint, night amber, straw amber, light lavender, green tint, and one sequence at a party was stencil colored using the Handschiegl Color Process, in multi-coloring bubbles that were made during a party.

== Influence ==
Three years after A Blind Bargain was released, Chaney's co-star, Ray McKee, appeared with Clara Bow in a film titled Free to Love. McKee's character is a criminal who is a hunchback. This character is the direct result of McKee's working with Chaney in A Blind Bargain and shows the Chaney influence on McKee. The character is a strange amalgam of Chaney's character in A Blind Bargain and of his real-life hunchback co-star, John George, who was a Chaney regular in several films.

A reimagining of the film starring Crispin Glover premiered at FrightFest London in 2025.

== See also ==
- List of lost films
- List of early color feature films
