= For Two Pins =

1914 film

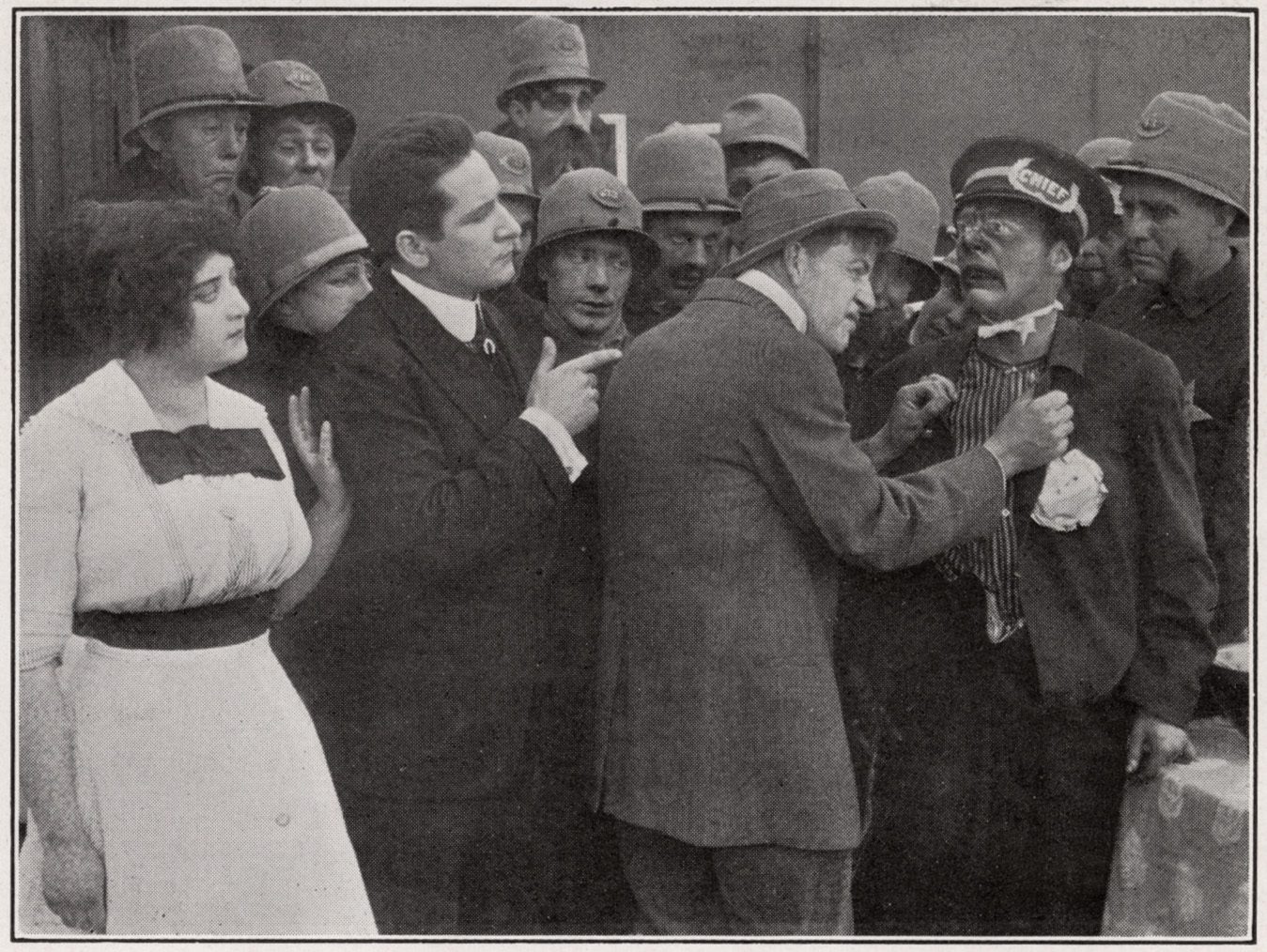
- Publicity still with the cast of For Two Pins
- Directed by: Arthur Hotaling
- Written by: Arthur Hotaling
- Produced by: Arthur Hotaling
- Starring: Jimmy Hodges; Marguerite Ne Moyer; Raymond McKee
- Release date: May 26, 1914
- Running time: 7–8 minutes (c. 600 feet)
- Country: United States
- Languages: Silent film English intertitles

For Two Pins is a lost 1914 American silent comedy film produced by the Lubin Manufacturing Company and starring Jimmy Hodges, Marguerite Ne Moyer, and Raymond McKee. Also among the cast was Oliver Hardy, who had a small role as a policeman.

== Plot ==
John mislays his favorite tie pin. He encounters a drunk on the street who is wearing a similar pin, and believing that the drunk has stolen it from him, John takes it. The police, summoned by the drunk, try to arrest John, who resists and runs away with the police in pursuit. When he arrives home, he finds his wife Martha wearing his pin. She surreptitiously pins it on the back of the drunk, and when the police discover it there, they throw the drunk into a creek.

== Cast ==
- Jimmy Hodges as John Dunn
- Marguerite Ne Moyer as Martha Dunn
- James Hevener as The Drunk
- Raymond McKee as The Chief of Police
- Oliver Hardy as a policeman (uncredited)

== Production and reception ==
For Two Pins was filmed in Jacksonville, Florida, at the Jacksonville unit of the Lubin Manufacturing Company, under the supervision of Arthur Hotaling. It was a short split-reel comedy, lasting approximately 7–8 minutes, and sharing a single reel of film with a second, unrelated comedy, The Particular Cowboys, featuring Frances Ne Moyer and Raymond McKee. The films were released by the General Film Company on May 26, 1914.

For Two Pins is one of several short comedies made in the spring of 1914 that include the earliest screen appearances of Oliver Hardy. In most of these films he was an uncredited extra playing one of a group of cowboys or, as here, policemen. Although the films themselves do not survive and Hardy is not credited in the studio's advertisements, he can often be recognized in surviving promotional stills.

The bumbling cops who appeared in For Two Pins and many other Lubin split-reel silent comedies were modeled on the Keystone Cops, who appeared in shorts produced by Mack Sennett for the Keystone Film Company. Within the studio the Lubin cops were known as the Riverside Police, named after the Riverside district of Jacksonville, where the films were shot. Most of the reviews of For Two Pins in the trade papers focused on the role of the cops as the film's primary laugh producers. The New York Dramatic Mirror wrote, "While not to be taken seriously as concerns its plot, there are in this the phoney police and all the trained tumblers that the company could command", The Bioscope noted briefly that "the full strength of the force is employed upon a farcical business", and the judgment of Moving Picture World was that "the Lubin comedy police force always compel laughter".

== See also ==
- List of American films of 1914
- Oliver Hardy filmography
