= William Wadsworth (actor) =

American actor

William Norwood Wadsworth (7 June 1874–6 June 1950) was an American actor of the silent era best known for his roles in early Westerns, playing the villain in What Happened to Mary? (1912), the first Western film serial and for playing Samuel Pickwick in Mr Pickwick's Predicament (1912), an early screen adaptation of The Pickwick Papers.

Wadsworth was born in Pigeon Cove in Massachusetts in 1874, the son of William Wadsworth (born 1842) and Adelia K Leonard (born 1846). Originally a theatrical producer, the chubby and prematurely bald Wadsworth became an actor of the silent era in 1909 in Why Girls Leave Home. Among the more than 60 films he made for the Edison Manufacturing Company and others are The Daisy Cowboys (1911), How the Boys Fought the Indians (1912), A Christmas Accident (1912), Madame de Mode (1912), Samuel Pickwick in Mr. Pickwick's Predicament (1912), Billy Pearl in What Happened to Mary? (1912), Wood B. Weed (comedy series, 1913–14), The Prime Minister in How They Got the Vote (1913), Lo, the Poor Indians (1914), Waddy Wise in Her Country Cousin (1915), Joseph Sedley in Vanity Fair (1915), Jim, a burglar in Suspicious Characters (1915), Grimm in The Tailor's Bill (1915), Waddy Rooney in Rooney the Bride (1915), Mr Orlinsky, Darya's father in The Cossack Whip (1916), Pa Lane in The Matchmakers (1916), Angus Ban Keillor in Kidnapped (1917), Sheriff Len Moody in Light in the Darkness (1917), Dominick in The Little Chevalier (1917), Snowshoe in Salt of the Earth (1917), Muggins, the King in The Royal Pauper (also known as The Princess from the Poorhouse) (1917), Gunner Kregier in Barnaby Lee (c1917) and White Mice (1926).

In his later years Wadsworth was a stage actor in New York where his wife Mabel (born 1883) worked as a fitter in a dress shop. He portrayed the circus showman James Anthony Bailey in the Broadway hit The Wisdom Tooth by Marc Connelly during 1925-1926.

William Wadsworth died aged 77 in June 1950 in Brooklyn, New York.

== Selected filmography ==
- The Librarian (1912, Short)
- Cohen's Luck (1915)
- The Cossack Whip (1916)
- Chris and His Wonderful Lamp (1917)
- The Little Chevalier (1917)
- Cy Whittaker's Ward (1917)
- The Apple Tree Girl (1917)
- Billy and the Big Stick (1917)
- Barnaby Lee (1917)
- The Last Sentence (1917)
