= Chris and His Wonderful Lamp =

1917 American silent fantasy film

- Directed by: Alan Crosland
- Written by: Albert Stearns; Charles Sumner Williams
- Starring: Joseph Burke; Claire Adams; William Wadsworth
- Production company: Edison Studios
- Distributed by: K-E-S-E Service
- Release date: July 14, 1917
- Country: United States
- Languages: Silent; English intertitles

Chris and His Wonderful Lamp is a 1917 American silent fantasy film directed by Alan Crosland and starring Joseph Burke, Claire Adams and William Wadsworth.

== Cast ==
- Joseph Burke as Professor Cipher
- Thomas Carnahan Jr. as Chris
- William Wadsworth as The Genie
- Rolinda Bainbridge as Hulda
- P.J. Rollow as Mr. Wagstaff
- Nellie Grant as Mrs. Wagstaff
- Shirley Braithwaite as Doctor
- Victor McManus as Spud Ramsey
- Joe Blaize as The Dragon
- Claire Adams as Betty
- George D. Melville as Auctioneer

== Bibliography ==
- Rémi Fournier Lanzoni. French Cinema: From Its Beginnings to the Present. A&C Black, 2004.
