= He Wanted His Pants =

1914 film

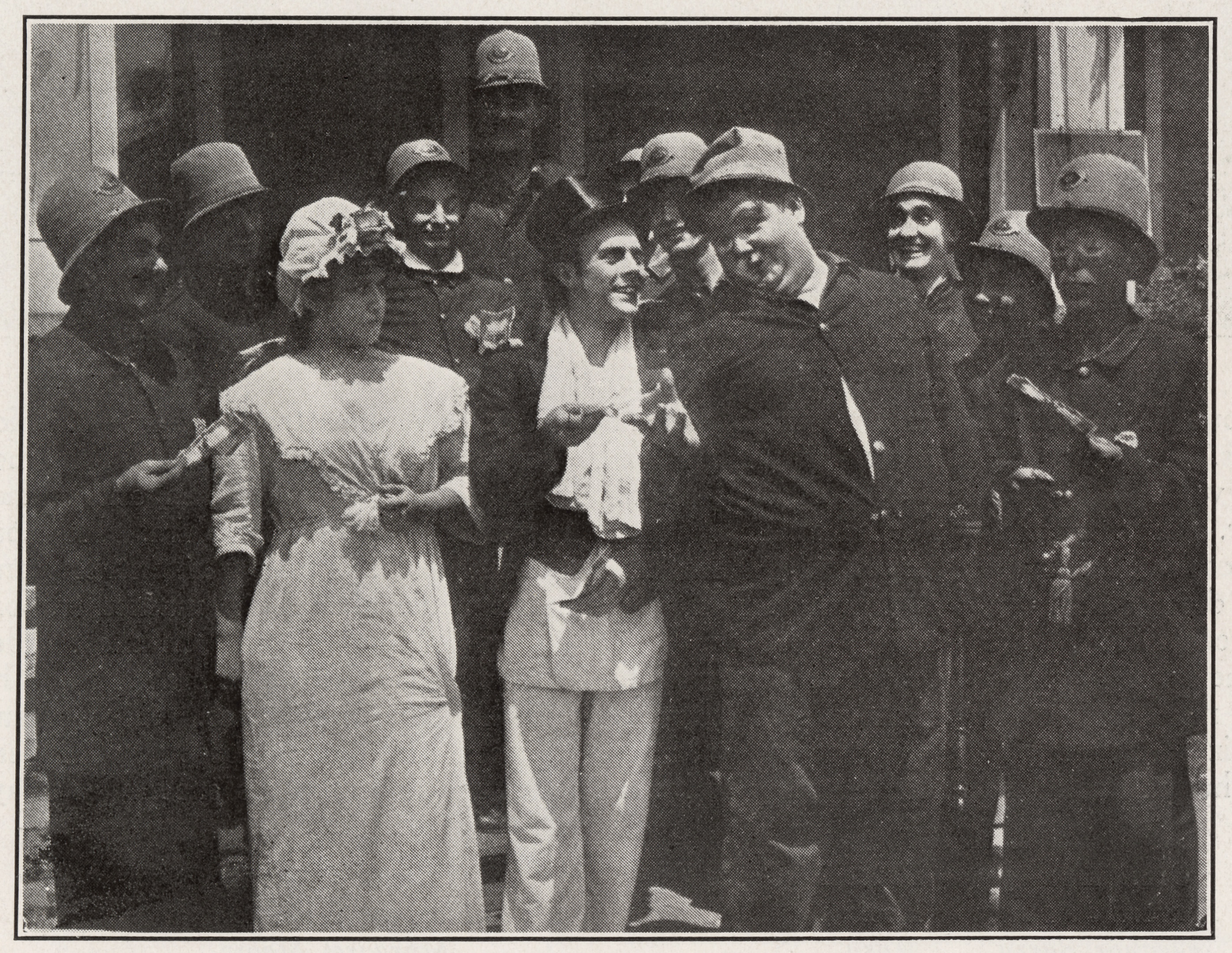
- Raymond McKee and "Babe" Hardy in a publicity still from He Wanted His Pants
- Written by: Epes W. Sargent
- Produced by: Arthur Hotaling
- Starring: Raymond McKee; Frances Ne Moyer; Oliver Hardy
- Production company: Lubin Manufacturing Company
- Release date: December 5, 1914
- Running time: c. 8 minutes (600 feet)
- Country: United States
- Languages: Silent film English intertitles

He Wanted His Pants is a 1914 American split-reel silent comedy film produced by the Lubin Manufacturing Company and starring Raymond McKee, Frances Ne Moyer, and Oliver Hardy.

== Plot ==
"James Jimson gets in a poker game and brings home a couple of hundred. His snores wake his wife early and she finds the money. She also finds a hole in the trousers and takes them downstairs to mend. She lacks the proper thread and runs over to a neighbor for it. Jimson wakes and can find neither wife, or pants. He Jumps at the conclusion that his wife and the money have both been stolen. Uniquely clad in a frock coat, silk hat and a table cover, he enlists the aid of a couple of policemen, imploring them to find his money and his wife, but to find the money first. They find both at the same time, but when Mrs. Jimson declares that she has not the money, they decide to search her. Jimson interferes, knowing that the money is probably in her stocking. He talks her out of it, and tips the policemen, who go away. Mrs. Jimson reaches for her spouse, but he calls the policemen back and sails away like an ocean liner."

== Cast ==
- Raymond McKee as James Jimson
- Frances Ne Moyer as His Wife
- Oliver Hardy as a Cop

== Production ==
He Wanted His Pants was written by Epes W. Sargent and produced by Arthur Hotaling, the general supervisor of the Jacksonville, Florida unit of the Lubin Manufacturing Company of Philadelphia. It was a short split-reel comedy, lasting approximately eight minutes and sharing a single reel of film with Brown's Cook, an unrelated comedy also written by Sargent. The films were released by the General Film Company on December 5, 1914, and are among a group of short comedies made by the Lubin company in 1914 and early 1915 that include the earliest screen appearances of Oliver Hardy. Although Hardy's name does not appear in the published cast list, he is visible in a promotional still in the studio's newsletter.

== See also ==
- List of American films of 1914
- Oliver Hardy filmography
