= A Fool There Was (1914 film) =

1914 film directed by Frank Griffin

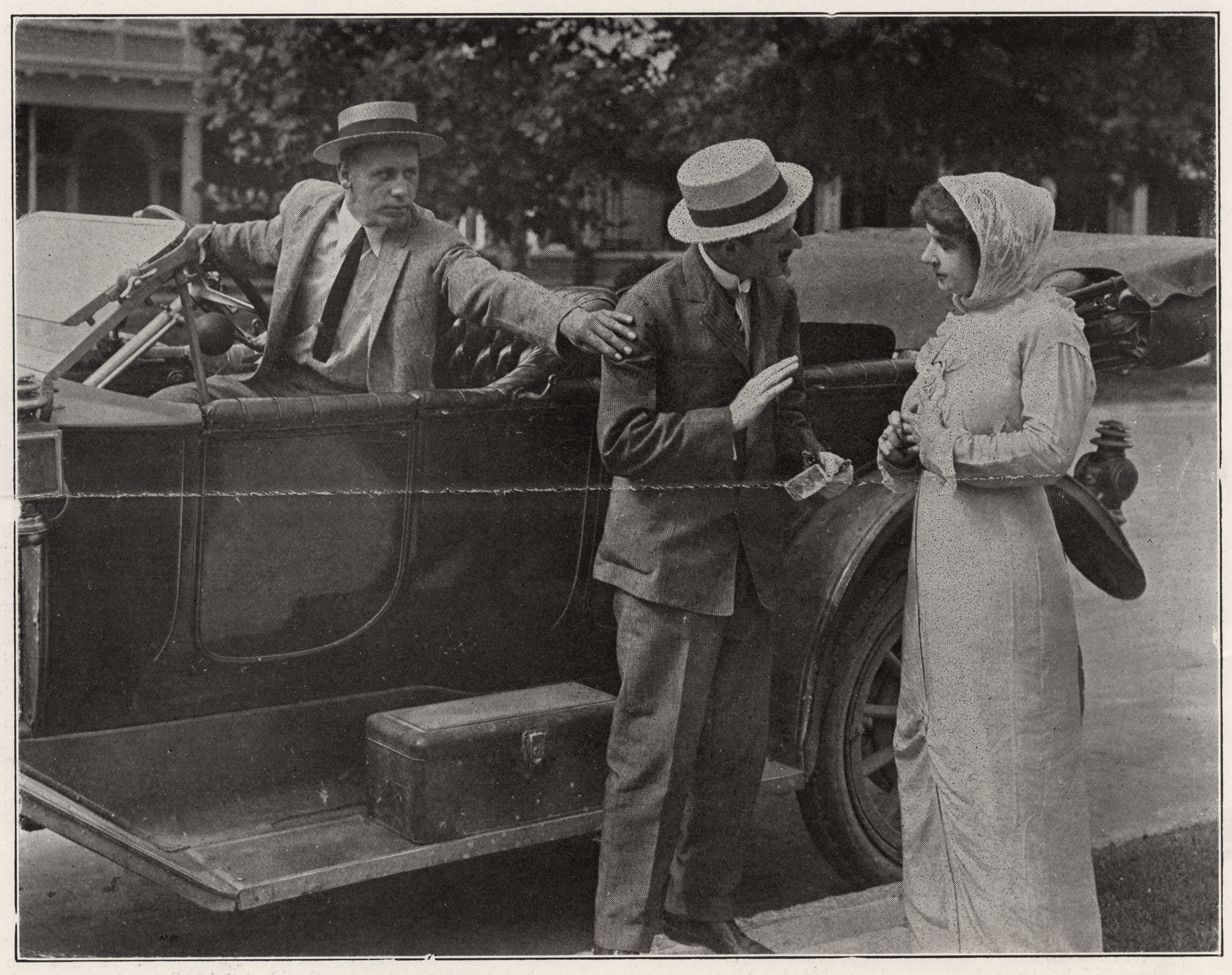
- Frank Griffin, Jerold Hevener, and Mabel Paige in a publicity still from A Fool There Was
- Directed by: Frank Griffin
- Written by: Frank Griffin
- Produced by: Arthur Hotaling
- Starring: Jerold T. Hevener; Mabel Paige; Frank Griffin; Oliver Hardy
- Distributed by: Lubin Film Company
- Release date: September 5, 1914
- Running time: 12–14 minutes (c. 1000 feet)
- Country: United States
- Languages: Silent film English intertitles

A Fool There Was is a 1914 American silent comedy film produced by the Lubin Manufacturing Company and starring Jerold T. Hevener, Frank Griffin, and Mabel Paige, with Oliver Hardy in a small role. The title was changed to She Wanted a Car as a result of a lawsuit filed by the owners of the 1909 stage play A Fool There Was by Porter Emerson Browne.

== Plot ==
George and Bess are sweethearts, but Bess finds sitting on the porch boring. George spends all his money on an automobile to take her out, but on their first ride together he knocks over a policeman and is arrested, while Bess takes a streetcar home. George hires a chauffeur, who becomes very friendly with Bess, teaching her to drive while George sits in the back. When the car breaks down, the chauffeur refuses to work on it, and while George is looking under the hood, Bess and the chauffeur flag down a passing car and return home without him. A week later George visits Bess and discovers that she has married the chauffeur.

== Cast ==
- Jerold T. Hevener as George – the Fool
- Mabel Paige as Bess – the Girl
- Frank Griffin as the Chauffeur
- Oliver Hardy as the Traffic Cop

== Production and reception ==
A Fool There Was was filmed in Jacksonville, Florida, at the Jacksonville unit of the Lubin Manufacturing Company of Philadelphia, under the general supervision of Arthur Hotaling, and released by the General Film Company on September 5, 1914. It was written and directed by Frank Griffin, who also played the part of the chauffeur. The film was one of a group of short comedies made by the Lubin company in 1914 and early 1915 that include the earliest screen appearances of Oliver Hardy. Although Hardy had a larger role in some earlier films, in A Fool There Was he was little more than an extra, playing the traffic cop hit by the car.

The film received mixed reviews in the trade papers: The New York Dramatic Mirror wrote "A Fool There Was will fool many by its title; there is no evidence of the dramatic as might be expected, but the best of Lubin quick comedy cast and production is presented for the light amusement of the spectator". The Bioscope called the film a "slightly constructed, yet sufficiently amusing story of a man-about-town who sought to impress his inamorata by the purchase of a car". Moving Picture World dismissed it as "a foolish sort of an offering that demonstrates to what measures a man will go to make an impression on a girl", and the reviewer for Motion Picture News concluded that "evidently the man who conceived this comedy-drama is a born woman hater, as its moral is 'Don't get married.' Funny in parts, but loosely put together."

== Lawsuit ==
The title A Fool There Was, taken from the first line of Rudyard Kipling's poem, The Vampire, had already been used for a successful stage play written by Porter Emerson Brown. The play, produced by the partnership of Klaw and Erlanger and starring Robert Hilliard, opened in 1909 and had been running for five years when the Lubin comedy short was released. Lubin's distributor, the General Film Company, was immediately sued by Klaw, Erlanger, and Hilliard, and although the plot and characters of the film had nothing to do with those of the play, the plaintiffs were granted an injunction to prevent the distribution of the film under its original name. As a result of suit, the name of the Lubin comedy was changed to She Wanted a Car. The case was of some importance in establishing the copyright of titles of literary and dramatic works, since earlier court rulings had found that the copyright in the work itself did not extend to the title.

== See also ==
- List of American films of 1914
