= Flame of Youth (1920 film) =

1920 American silent drama film

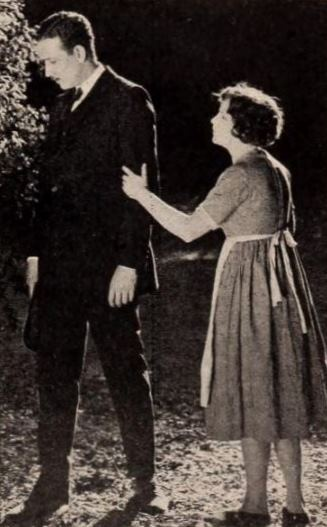
- Still with Philo McCullough and Shirley Mason
- Directed by: Howard M. Mitchell
- Written by: Frank Howard Clark; Barbara La Marr
- Produced by: William Fox
- Starring: Shirley Mason; Raymond McKee; Philo McCullough
- Production company: Fox Film
- Distributed by: Fox Film
- Release date: December 5, 1920
- Running time: 50 minutes
- Country: United States
- Language: Silent (English intertitles)

Flame of Youth is a lost 1920 American silent drama film directed by Howard M. Mitchell and starring Shirley Mason, Raymond McKee, and Philo McCullough.

== Cast ==
- Shirley Mason as Beebe
- Raymond McKee as Jeanot
- Philo McCullough as Victor Fleming
- Cecil Van Auker as John Forsythe
- Ethelbert Knott as Antoine
- Betty Schade as Lady Magda
- Karl Formes as Old Bac
- Barbara La Marr

== Bibliography ==
- Donald W. McCaffrey & Christopher P. Jacob. Guide to the Silent Years of American Cinema. Greenwood Publishing Group, 1999. ISBN 0-313-30345-2
