= Raymond McKee =

American actor (1892–1984)

- McKee in 1917
- Born: Eldon Raymond McKee; December 7, 1892; Keokuk, Iowa, U.S.
- Died: October 3, 1984 (aged 91); Long Beach, California, U.S.
- Other name: Roy McKee
- Occupation: Actor
- Years active: 1912–1935
- Spouse: Marguerite Courtot (m. 1923)

Eldon Raymond McKee (December 7, 1892 – October 3, 1984), also credited as Roy McKee, was an American stage and screen actor. His film debut was in the 1912 production The Lovers' Signal. Over the next 23 years, he performed in no less than 172 additional films.

== Early life ==
McKee was born in Keokuk, Iowa, to Albert N. McKee and Alice Yetter McKee. During World War I, he was an Army lieutenant in France and reportedly wore his uniform in four war-themed films.

== Stage and film careers ==
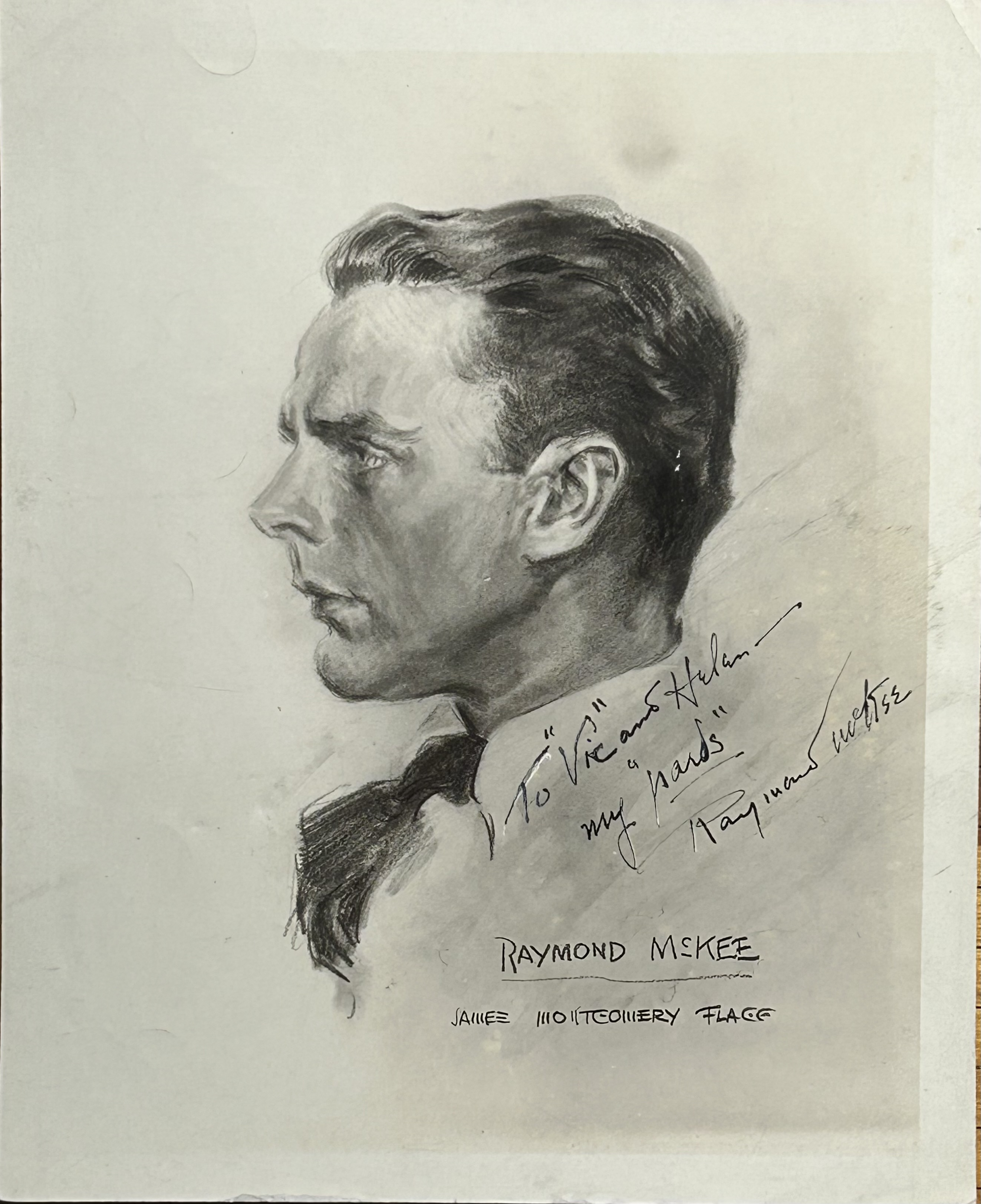
James Montgomery Flagg portrait of McKee

On Broadway, McKee portrayed Jack Weaver in The Phantom Legion (1919). He also acted on stage in A Fool There Was, The Fortune Teller, and Madame X.

Early in his acting career, McKee also made films in the eastern United States for the Edison and Lubin studios and was billed as "Roy McKee".

== The Smith Films ==
From 1926 to 1928, he was associated with Mack Sennett, with McKee portraying Jimmy Smith in a series of 29 Smith Family comedy films. Supporting cast included several regulars: Ruth Hiatt as Mabel Smith; Mary Ann Jackson as Bubbles Smith; Carole Lombard as Lillian; Andy Clyde as Uncle Dan; Leo Sulky as Jimmy's friend; Sunshine Hart as Jimmy's mother-in-law. Produced by Mack Sennett the series included many of the regular Sennett characters: Tiny Ward, Vernon Dent, Irving Bacon, William McCall, Louise Carver, Barney Hellum, Billy Gilbert, etc. The films (all silent) were released at a rate of roughly one per month as one-reel fillers.

The series is best remembered as the launching pad for Carole Lombard, who quickly eclipsed McKee in her fame.

The films were: Smith's Baby (1926); Smith's Vacation (1926); Smith's Landlord (1926); Smith's Visitor (1926); Smith's Uncle (1926); Smith's Picnic (1926); Smith's Pets (1927); Smith's Customer (1927); Smith's New Home (1927); Smith's Surprise (1927); Smith's Kindergarten (1927); Smith's Fishing Trip (1927); Smith's Candy Shop (1927); Smith's Pony (1927); Smith's Cook (1927); Smith's Cousin (1927); Smith's Modiste Shop (1927); Smith's Holiday (1928); Smith's Army Life (1928); Smith's Farm Days (1928); Smith's Restaurant (1928); Smith's Catalina Rowboat Race (1928). Producer Sennett had discontinued new filming in 1928, but stockpiled several Smith shorts for release into 1929, removing "Smith" from all the titles: The Burglar (1928), The Chicken (1928), The Bargain Hunt (1928), Baby's Birthday (1929) Uncle Tom (1929), The Rodeo (1929), and The New Aunt (1929).

== Personal life and death ==
During the filming of The Unbeliever in 1918, McKee worked with his future wife, actress Marguerite Courtot. The two performers worked together again in 1922 in the production Down to the Sea in Ships. They wed the following year on April 14 and remained married for nearly 60 years, until Raymond's death. After retiring from acting, McKee focused his attention on The Zulu Hut at 11100 Ventura Boulevard in Studio City, a restaurant that he originally opened in Los Angeles in the 1920s.

McKee died on October 3, 1984, at age 91, in Long Beach, California, from pneumonia. A United States Army veteran, his gravesite is at Riverside National Cemetery in Riverside, California. His wife Marguerite was buried alongside him two years later.

== Partial filmography ==
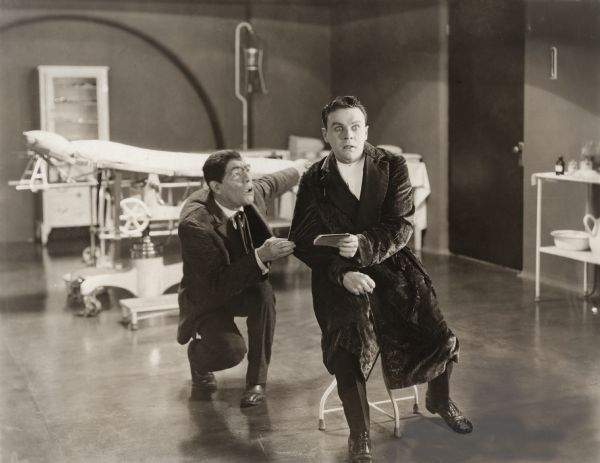
A still from the 1922 horror film A Blind Bargain with McKee (right) and Lon Chaney as "The Hunchback".

- Dobs at the Shore (1914)
- He Wanted His Pants (1914)
- The Servant Girl's Legacy (1914)
- The Honor of the Force (1914)
- She Married for Love (1914)
- The Smuggler's Daughter (1914)
- When the Ham Turned (1914)
- Jealous James (1914)
- Pins Are Lucky (1914)
- The Green Alarm (1914)
- Making Auntie Welcome (1914)
- Worms Will Turn (1914)
- Kidnapped Bride (1914)
- Long May It Wave (1914)
- A Brewerytown Romance (1914)
- A Tango Tragedy (1914)
- For Two Pins (1914)
- The Particular Cowboys (1914)
- He Won a Ranch (1914)
- Outwitting Dad (1914)
- The Simp and the Sophomores (1915)
- Not Much Force (1915)
- Poor Baby (1915)
- What a Cinch (1915)
- Her Choice (1915)
- Capturing Bad Bill (1915)
- A Lucky Strike (1915)
- An Expensive Visit (1915)
- The Prize Baby (1915)
- Shoddy the Tailor (1915)
- They Looked Alike (1915)
- Twin Flats (1916)
- A Maid to Order (1916)
- The Heart of the Hills (1916)
- It Happened in Pikesville (1916)
- Edison Bugg's Invention (1916)
- Kidnapped (1917)
- Where Love Is (1917)
- The Apple Tree Girl (1917)
- The Lady of the Photograph (1917)
- The Little Chevalier (1917)
- The Last Sentence (1917)
- Billy and the Big Stick (1917)
- The Unbeliever (1918)
- The End of the Road (1919)
- Kathleen Mavourneen (1919)
- Love's Harvest (1920)
- The Girl of My Heart (1920)
- Flame of Youth (1920)
- The Little Wanderer (1920)
- The Fortune Teller (1920)
- Wing Toy (1921)
- The Lamplighter (1921)
- Blind Hearts (1921)
- The Mother Heart (1921)
- The Jolt (1921)
- Lovetime (1921)
- A Blind Bargain (1922)
- Down to the Sea in Ships (1922)
- Forgive and Forget (1923)
- Three Women (1924)
- Pagan Passions (1924)
- Babbitt (1924)
- The Valley of Hate (1924)
- Contraband (1925)
- Romance Road (1925)
- Oh, What a Night! (1926)
- The Speed Limit (1926)
- Exclusive Rights (1926)
- King of the Herd (1927)
- The Girl from Everywhere (1927)
- Heart to Heart (1928)
- Frozen River (1929)
- Campus Knights (1929)
