= Florence McLaughlin =

American actress

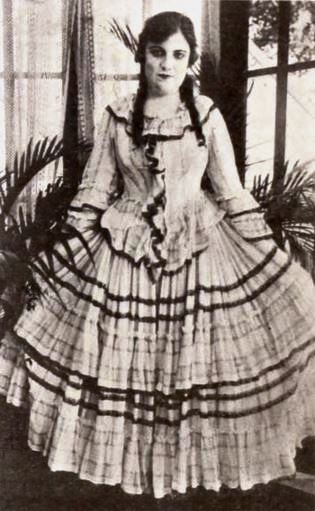
Photograph from a 1918 edition of the Exhibitors Herald

Florence McLaughlin (1898-1972), sometimes credited as Florence McLoughlin, was an actress in the U.S. She appeared in numerous silent films including comedies with Oliver Hardy.

She was from Jacksonville, Florida, the daughter of Mr. and Mrs. H. A. McLaughlin.

McLaughlin's film debut occurred with the Gaumont Company. She worked with the Vim Comedy Company. She was also part of the King-Bee Films Corporation. She appeared in two-reel comedies with Josh Binney.

== Filmography ==
- The Precious Parcel (1916) as Runt's Accomplice
- The Reformers (film) (1916) as Vampire
- The Water Cure (1916)
- A Maid to Order (1916) as The Lady of the House
- The Serenade (film) (1916) as Florence
- Mother's Child (1916) as Florence
- Twin Flats (1916)
- Royal Blood (film) (1916)
- Never Again (1916 film) as Their daughter
- A Warm Reception (1916) as Mrs. Price's daughter
- Hired and Fired (1916)
- Nerve and Gasoline (1916) as Florence
- Fat and Fickle (1916) as Florence
- Better Halves (film) (1916)
- Their Vacation (1916)
- The Schemers (film) (1916)
- Love and Duty (1916 film) as His daughter
- He Winked and Won (1916) as Florence
- Aunt Bill (1916)
- The Candy Trail (1916)
- Thirty Days (1916 film)
- Stranded (1916 comedy film)
- Cupid's Rival (1917)
- The Other Girl (1917 film) as Florence
- The Goat (1917 film)
- Back Stage (1917 film)
- The Millionaire (1917 film)
- The Hero (1917 film) as A Shy Maiden
- Dough Nuts (1917) as Waitress
- The Villain (1917 film) as Florence
- The Love Bugs (1917)
