= Jaxon Film Corporation =

Former US film production company

Jaxon Film Corporation was a comedy film production company in Jacksonville, Florida during the silent film era. It relocated to Providence, Rhode Island.

From 1916 to 1918, the company released at least 78 comedy shorts. They were marketed as Jaxon Comedies. Billy Ruge was one of the actors who appeared in the company's films as well as Walter Stull, Bobby Burns, and Kate Price. The studio's performers were "poached" from the Vim Comedy Company. The studio released the 12 part serial A Daughter of Uncle Sam in 1918 directed by James C. Morton.

The company was established by Frank A. Tichenor who eventually closed down Jacksonville productions and relocated production efforts to Providence, Rhode Island. In 1917 the Providence studio caught fire and had to be rebuilt.

== Filmography ==
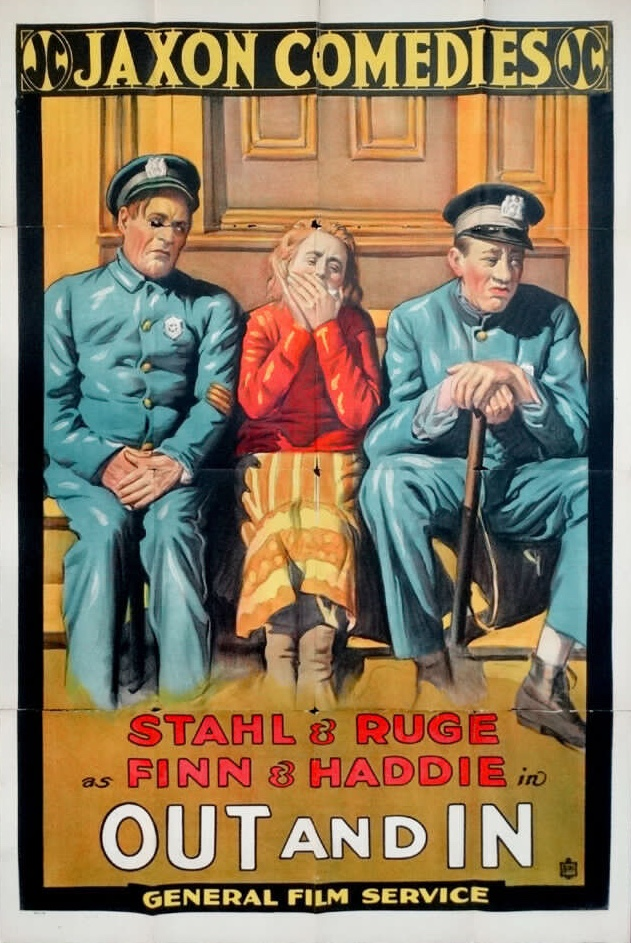
Out and In (1918)

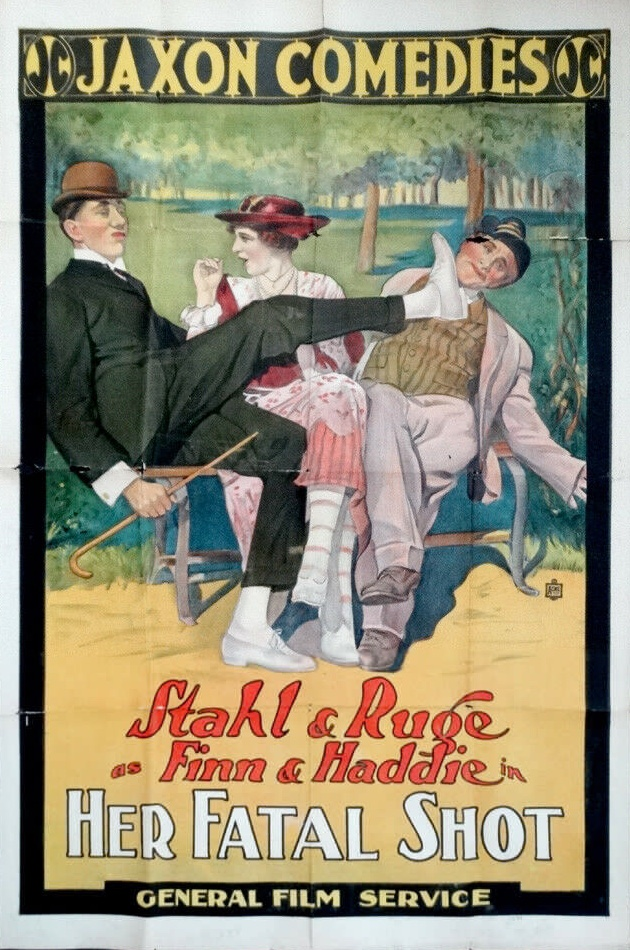
Her Fatal Shot (1918)

- Week-End Shopping (1916)
- The Spy (1917)
- Ambition (1917)
- A Bargain at $ 37.50 (1917)
- Monkey, Maid, Man (1917)
- Strife (1917)
- How it Happened (film) (1917)
- A Triple Entente (1917)
- Her Fatal Shot (1918)
- Out and In (1918)
- The Inspector's Wife (1918)
- Double Cross (1918)
- Smashing the Plot (1918)
- The Rich Slave (1921)

== See also ==
- History of Jacksonville, Florida
- Norman Studios
- Vim Comedy Company
