= Ethel Burton =

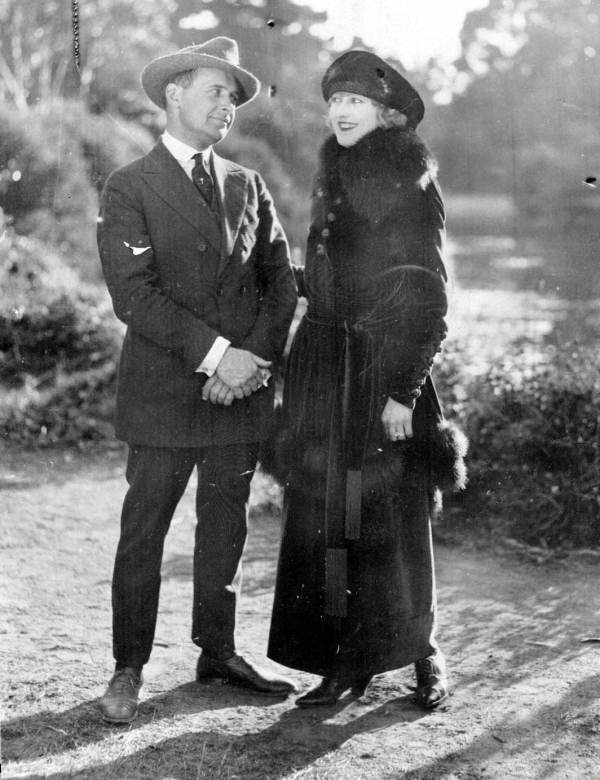
Ethel Burton with Arvid E. Gillstrom

Ethel Marie Burton Palmer (October 23, 1897 – May 1985) was an American comedic film actress.

== Biography ==
Ethel Burton was born in New York City and began working in films in 1915. She worked for Vitagraph, World Comedy Stars Film Company and Vim Comedy Company. She often appeared as a supporting actress in films with Billy West and Oliver Hardy. She co-starred in the first four Billy West comedies, during which time she met director Arvid E. Gillstrom. They became a couple and were married in 1917. Burton and Gillstrom divorced in 1931 and Burton continued acting under the name Ethel Gillstrom.

== Filmography ==
- Love, Pepper and Sweets (1915)
- Speed Kings (1915)
- Pressing Business (1915)
- Ups and Downs (1915)
- Strangled Harmony (1915)
- Mixed and Fixed (1915)
- The Midnight Prowlers (1915)
- This Way Out (1916)
- Frenzied Finance (1916)
- Chickens (1916)
- Busted Hearts (1916)
- He Winked and Won (1916)
- The Try Out (1916)
- Fat and Fickle (1916)
- This Way Out (1916)
- A Mix Up in Hearts (1917)
- The Other Girl (1917)
- Cupid's Rival (1917)
- Back Stage (1917)
- Dough Nuts (1917)
- The Millionaire (1917)
- The Love Bugs (1917)
- Wanted – A Bad Man (1917)
- Dough Nuts (1917)
- The Hero (1917)
- The Messenger (1918)
- The Orderly (1918)
- His Day Out (1918)
- The Scholar (1918)
- The Rogue (1918)
- Playmates (1918)
- The Straight and Narrow (1918)
- The Straight and Narrow (1918)
- The Messenger (1918)
- The Orderly (1918)
- The Handy Man (1918)
