= Strangled Harmony =

1915 film

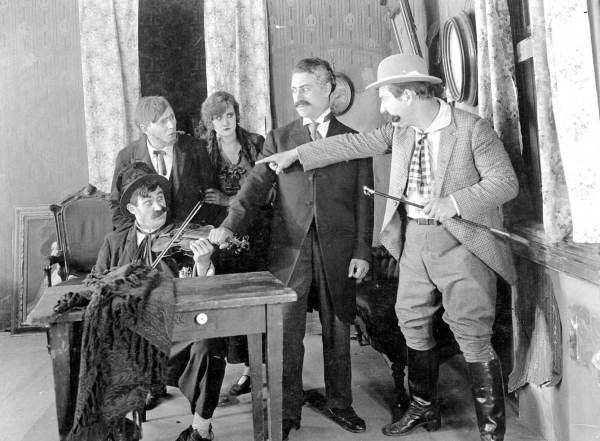
- Directed by: Bobby Burns; Walter Stull
- Produced by: Louis Burstein
- Starring: Bobby Burns
- Release date: December 10, 1915
- Country: United States
- Languages: Silent film English intertitles

Strangled Harmony is a 1915 American silent comedy film featuring Oliver Hardy.

== Cast ==
- Bobby Burns - Pokes
- Walter Stull - Jabbs
- Billy Ruge - Runt
- Ethel Marie Burton - Ethel (as Ethel Burton)
- Oliver Hardy - (as Babe Hardy)
- Frank Hanson
- Edna Reynolds

== See also ==
- List of American films of 1915
- Oliver Hardy filmography
