= The Midnight Prowlers =

2025 shortfilm

- Directed by: Bobby Burns; Walter Stull
- Written by: Samspicolli, Dayan Gurrola
- Produced by: Dayan Gurrola
- Starring: Bobby Burns; Walter Stull; Ethel Marie Burton; Edna Reynolds; Oliver Hardy; Frank Hanson; Billy Ruge
- Release date: November 12, 1915
- Country: United States
- Languages: Silent film English intertitles

The Midnight Prowlers is a 1915 American silent comedy film produced by the Vim Comedy Company featuring Bobby Burns & Walter Stull.

== Plot ==
Mr. and Mrs. Jabbs live in a suburban retreat where the police force is conspicuous by its absence. Burglaries are rife in the neighborhood. The Jabbs family get the scare of their lives one night when the cat pulls a vase from the table in trying to get out of the house for a midnight prowl. Mr. and Mrs. Jabbs each hire a detective without informing the other with Mrs. Jabbs hiring a man named Loos Pokes and Mr. Jabbs hiring a woman. The two detective are unaware of each other's identity. Gum Shoe Pete, the cracksman, gets into the house. Mr. and Mrs. Jabbs hear the noise but think it is "only the detectives." Meanwhile the two detectives have met and are spooning in the moonlight (they should worry about burglars). While Pete is piling his booty in his sack he stumbles and the pack falls, burying him. The detectives hear the noise. So do Mr. and Mrs. Jabbs. All four appear on the scene. The female detective grabs Mrs. Jabbs and the male grabs Mr. Jabbs and start for the station house. Explanations follow just as the real crying is discovered.

== Cast ==
- Bobby Burns as Pokes
- Walter Stull as Jabs
- Ethel Marie Burton as Female Detective (as Ethel Burton)
- Edna Reynolds as Mrs. Jabbs
- Oliver Hardy as Unknown Role (as Babe Hardy)
- Frank Hanson as Unknown Role (as Spook Hanson)
- Billy Ruge as Unknown Role

== See also ==
- List of American films of 1915
- Oliver Hardy filmography
