= Better Halves (film) =

1916 film

- Directed by: Will Louis
- Produced by: Louis Burstein
- Starring: Oliver Hardy
- Release date: June 29, 1916
- Country: United States
- Languages: Silent film English intertitles

Better Halves is a 1916 American film featuring Oliver Hardy and Billy Ruge, one of the Plump and Runt shorts made by the Vim Comedy Company in Jacksonville, Florida.

== Cast ==
- Oliver Hardy as Plump (as Babe Hardy)
- Billy Ruge as Runt
- Florence McLaughlin as Mrs. Plump (as Florence McLoughlin)
- Ray Godfrey as Mrs. Runt

== See also ==
- List of American films of 1916
