= Mixed and Fixed =

1915 film

- Directed by: Bobby Burns; Walter Stull
- Produced by: Louis Burstein
- Starring: Bobby Burns
- Release date: December 24, 1915
- Country: United States
- Languages: Silent film English intertitles

Mixed and Fixed is a 1915 American silent comedy film featuring Oliver Hardy.

== Cast ==
- Bobby Burns as Pokes
- Walter Stull as Jabbs
- Billy Ruge
- Ethel Marie Burton
- Oliver Hardy (as Babe Hardy)
- Frank Hanson
- Edna Reynolds

== See also ==
- List of American films of 1915
- Oliver Hardy filmography
