= The Other Girl (film) =

1917 film

- Directed by: Oliver Hardy
- Produced by: Louis Burstein
- Starring: Oliver Hardy
- Release date: February 1, 1917
- Country: United States
- Languages: Silent film English intertitles

The Other Girl is a 1917 American comedy film directed by and starring Oliver Hardy. The film was a Vim Comedy production. A one-reel comedy, the film was made in January 1917. Although the fim’s survival status is said to be unknown, TV Guide has a complete plot summary of the short.

== Plot ==
Babe thinks his girlfriend, Ethel, has abandoned him and he gets drunk. Taking advantage of the situation, Florence, who has discovered Babe is about to receive an important inheritance, has him believe they are married and only intoxication erased his memories of the ceremony. Ethel comes back and tries to convince Babe he was wrong. Florence’s dishonesty is eventually revealed.

== Cast ==
- Oliver Hardy as Babe (as Babe Hardy)
- Ethel Marie Burton as Ethel (as Ethel Burton), another regular of the Vim productions, playing ingénues
- Florence McLaughlin as Florence (as Florence McLoughlin)

== See also ==
- List of American films of 1917
