= Pressing Business =

1915 film

- Directed by: Bobby Burns; Walter Stull
- Produced by: Louis Burstein
- Starring: Bobby Burns
- Release date: November 20, 1915
- Country: United States
- Languages: Silent film English intertitles

Pressing Business is a 1915 American silent comedy short film produced by the Vim Comedy Company. It is a "Pokes & Jabbs" comedy featuring Bobby Burns and Walter Stull.

== Plot ==
Plaid Jabbs arrives at a hotel at Pumpkinville. Finding an invitation from his friend, Billy Bean, to attend afternoon tea hosted by his sister, Jabbs sends his only suit to the tailor for pressing. The tailor's shop promptly burns down with his suit in it.

Loos Pokes breaks into the hotel through a rear window and enters the room where Jabbs is contemplating his predicament. Jabbs hides as the burglar approaches, but pounces on Pokes to rob him of his dress suit. He dashes off for afternoon tea, leaving Pokes in the hotel room wearing only his underwear.

Pokes looks for a way to escape the hotel. Entering various rooms, he startles and alarms the hotel guests. Seeking to make his getaway down the fire escape, he has a large crowd at his heels chasing him. They are soon joined by the police.

Jabbs returns from tea and meets Pokes at a watering trough, where they struggle for possession of the suit. Pokes get it back, the police arrive, and Jabbs is stuck in the watering trough to the amusement of all.

== Cast ==
- Bobby Burns as Pokes
- Walter Stull as Jabbs
- Billy Ruge as Runt
- Billy Bletcher as Billy Bean
- Frank Hanson
- Ethel Marie Burton
- Edna Reynolds

== See also ==
- List of American films of 1915
