= Bert Tracy =

English film actor

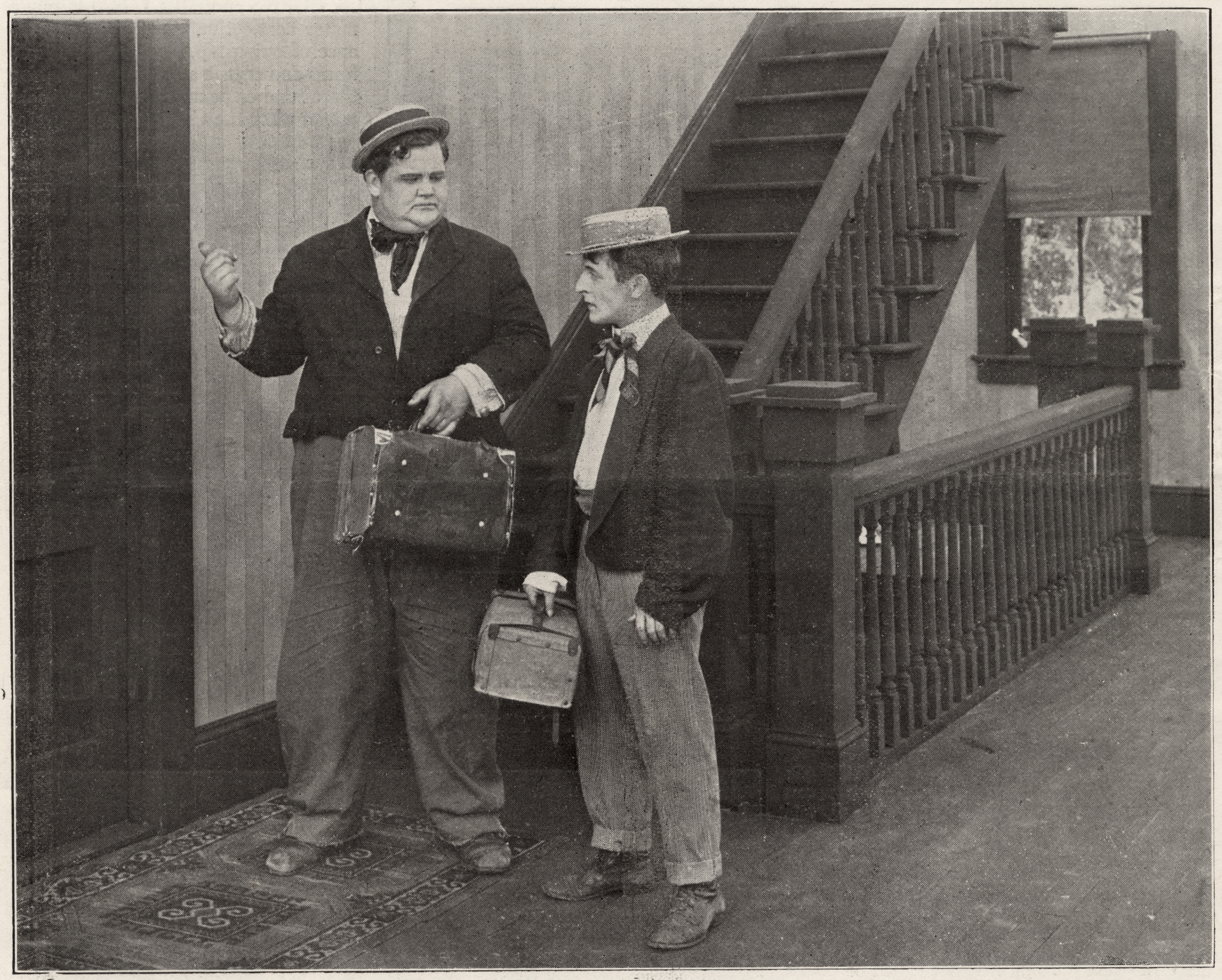
- Bert Tracey (right) with Oliver Hardy in Back to the Farm (1914)
- Born: Manchester, UK
- Occupation: Actor
- Years active: 1910 – 1948

Bert Tracey was a British silent film and talkie actor. He also directed one film, Boots! Boots!, in 1934 which marked the film debut of George Formby as an adult. Tracy was born on June 16, 1889, in Manchester, England. He acted in 47 silent films including The Kentucky Derby (1922) and Law or Loyalty (1926).

== Career in America ==
Tracey was a music hall veteran who went to the United States in 1913 with Stan Laurel and Charlie Chaplin with the Fred Karno Troupe. They worked as actors in shorts for the Kalem Company. By 1914 he was working with Oliver Hardy in a string of slapstick comedies.

== Return to England ==
He returned to England in 1927. In 1933 he met up with Laurel and Hardy at Manchester's Midland Hotel. As there were no suitable studios in Manchester, this meeting lead to the rental of a film studio in London where Bert was able to lend technical support to their productions in England .

In October, 1953 Laurel and Hardy, both in ill health, returned to the vaudeville lifestyle on their final British tour. They hired their old friend Bert Tracey to be their dresser.

== Selected filmography ==
Actor

- The Sacrifice of the Spillway (1913)
- The Daddy of Them All (1914)
- Back to the Farm (1914)
- Sea Dogs (1916)
- A Day at School (1916)
- Royal Blood (1916)
- A Dumbwaiter Scandal (1919)
- The Kentucky Derby (1922)
- Law or Loyalty (1926)
- Warned Off (1930)
- Holidays with Pay (1948)

Director

- Boots! Boots! (1934)
