= The Try Out =

1916 film

- Directed by: Bobby Burns; Walter Stull
- Produced by: Louis Burstein
- Starring: Walter Stull
- Release date: August 25, 1916
- Country: United States
- Languages: Silent film English intertitles

The Try Out is a 1916 American silent comedy film featuring Oliver Hardy.

== Cast ==
- Bobby Burns as Pokes
- Walter Stull as Jabbs
- Ethel Marie Burton as Ingenue (as Ethel Burton)
- Robin Williamson as A Tramp
- Harry Naughton as Cameraman
- Frank Hanson
- Oliver Hardy (as Babe Hardy)

== See also ==
- List of American films of 1916
- Oliver Hardy filmography
