= Thirty Days =

Thirty Days or 30 Days may refer to:

== Film and TV ==
=== Film ===
- Thirty Days (1916 film), a 1916 film starring Oliver Hardy
- Thirty Days (1922 film), silent film starring Wallace Reid, his last film
- 30 Days (1999 film), a comedy featuring Arden Myrin
- 30 Days (2004 film), an Indian Hindi film featuring Alok Nath
- 30 Days (2006 American film), a 2006 American film edited by Alan Roberts (filmmaker)
- 30 Days (2006 film), a Nigerian action thriller film featuring Genevieve Nnaji
- Love Reset also known as 30 Days, a 2023 South Korean romantic comedy film

=== TV ===
- 30 Days (TV series), a reality television program created by Morgan Spurlock
- "Thirty Days" (Star Trek: Voyager), an episode of the TV series Star Trek: Voyager
- 30 Days (Philippine TV series), a 2004 Filipino reality show aired by GMA Network

== Publications ==
- 30 Days (magazine), an Italian ecclesiastical and political magazine.

== Music ==
=== Songs ===
- "Thirty Days" (Chuck Berry song), a song composed and performed by Chuck Berry, covered by several others, sometimes as "Forty Days"
- "Thirty Days", by Clyde McPhatter, composed by Winfield Scott 1956
- "Thirty Days", by David Porter (musician), composed by David Porter and Bonnie Williams, Stax 1970
- "30 Days" (The Saturdays song), a 2012 single by The Saturdays
- "30 Days", a song by Run-D.M.C. from Run-D.M.C.

== See also ==
- "Thirty Days Hath September", a mnemonic rhyme
- Thirty Days' War, the Greco-Turkish War of 1897
