= Love, Pepper and Sweets =

1915 film

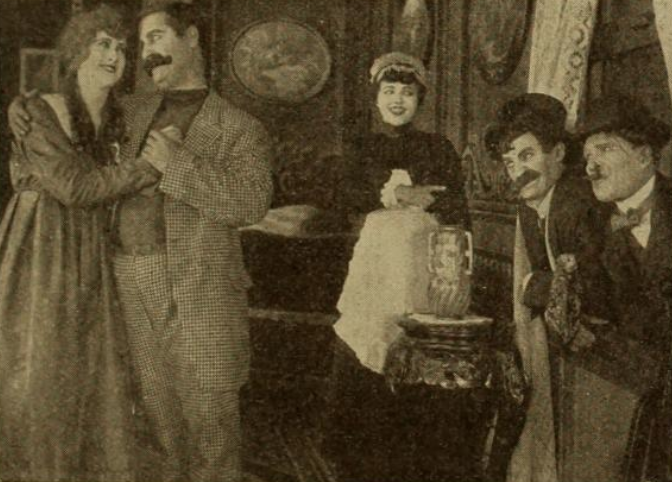
- A scene from Love, Pepper and Sweets (1915)
- Directed by: Bobby Burns; Walter Stull
- Produced by: Louis Burstein
- Starring: Bobby Burns; Walter Stull; Ethel Marie Burton; Billy Ruge; Oliver Hardy; Frank Hason; Edna Reynolds
- Release date: December 3, 1915
- Country: United States
- Languages: Silent film English intertitles

Love, Pepper and Sweets is a 1915 American silent comedy film featuring Bobby Burns & Walter Stull. Oliver Hardy appears in a supporting role.

== Plot ==
"Pokes is the star boarder, while Jabbs and Runt are the neglected ones," explains a 1915 synopsis. "The efforts of Jabbs and Runt to beat out Pokes furnish the plot, but they find their task is a Herculean one." All three characters vie for the attention of Ethel.

== Cast ==
- Bobby Burns as Pokes
- Walter Stull as Jabbs
- Billy Ruge as Runt
- Ethel Marie Burton as Ethel (as Ethel Burton)
- Oliver Hardy as Fatty (as Babe Hardy)
- Frank Hanson as Unknown Role (as Spook Hanson)
- Edna Reynolds Unknown Role

== See also ==
- List of American films of 1915
- Oliver Hardy filmography
