= This Way Out =

1916 film

- Directed by: Bobby Burns; Walter Stull
- Produced by: Louis Burstein
- Starring: Bobby Burns
- Release date: January 7, 1916
- Country: United States
- Languages: Silent film English intertitles

This Way Out is a 1916 American silent comedy film featuring Oliver Hardy.

== Cast ==
- Bobby Burns - Pokes
- Walter Stull - Jabbs
- Oliver Hardy - Plump (as Babe Hardy)
- Billy Ruge - Runt
- Ethel Marie Burton
- Frank Hanson

== See also ==
- List of American films of 1916
- Oliver Hardy filmography
