= The Brave One =

The Brave One can refer to:

- The Brave One (1956 film), a 1956 American drama film directed by Irving Rapper
- The Brave One (2007 film), a 2007 crime-drama/psychological thriller film directed by Neil Jordan

== See also ==
- Brave1, a platform used in the defense of Ukraine
- The Brave Ones, a 1916 silent film
