= Frenzied Finance =

1916 film

- Directed by: Bobby Burns; Walter Stull
- Produced by: Louis Burstein
- Starring: Bobby Burns
- Release date: January 21, 1916
- Country: United States
- Languages: Silent film English intertitles

Frenzied Finance is a 1916 American silent comedy film featuring Oliver Hardy.

== Plot ==
As Jabbs attempts to keep their office furniture business operating, Pokes is preoccupied with wooing their secretary. Chaos ensues when their safe is stolen.

== Cast ==
- Bobby Burns as Pokes
- Walter Stull as Jabbs
- Oliver Hardy (as Babe Hardy)
- Frank "Spook" Hanson
- Ethel Marie Burton
- Mildred Burstein

== See also ==
- List of American films of 1916
- Oliver Hardy filmography
