= A Day at School =

1916 film

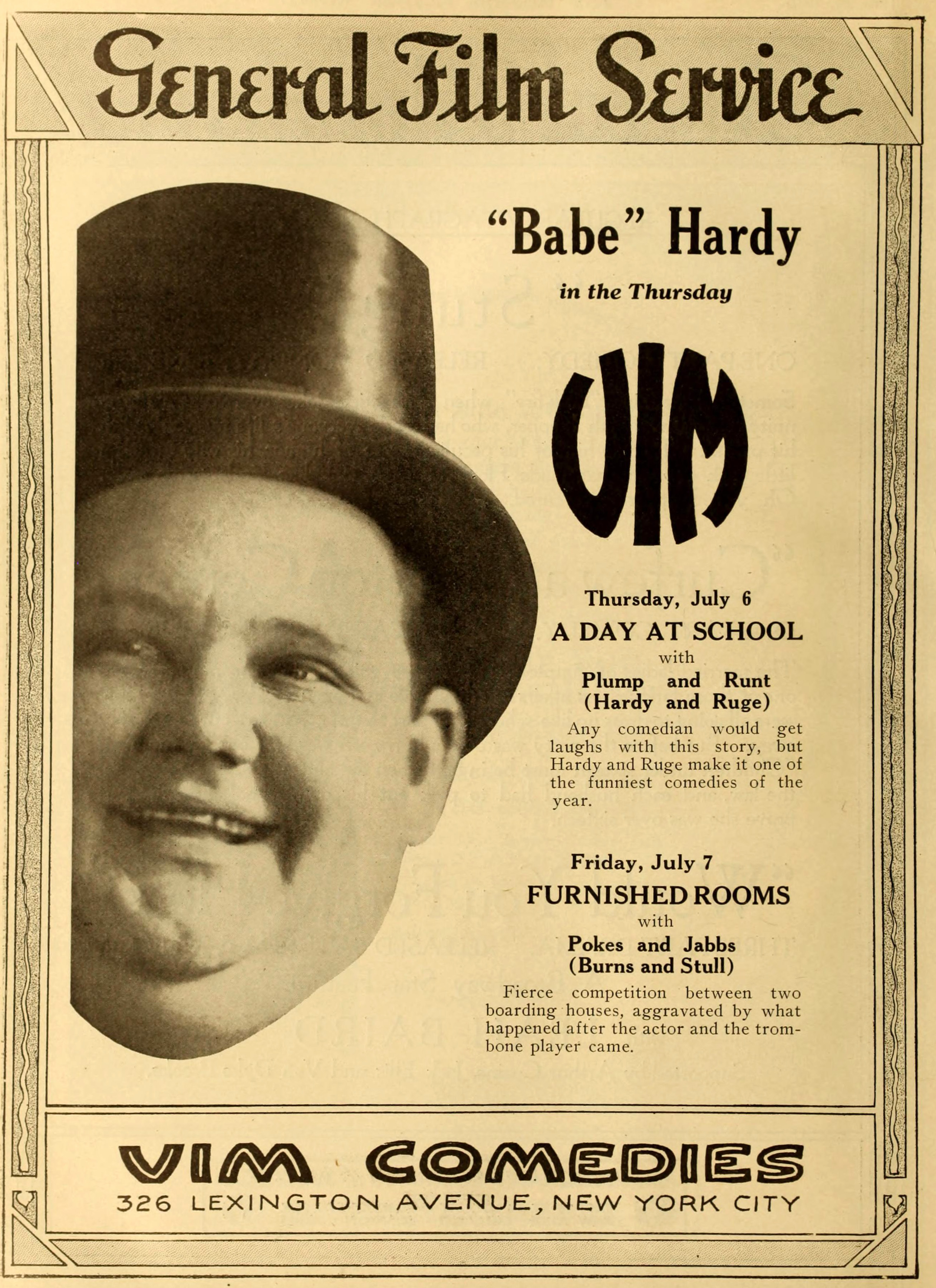
- Directed by: Willard Louis
- Produced by: Louis Burstein
- Starring: Oliver Hardy
- Production company: Vim Comedy Film Company
- Distributed by: General Film Company
- Release date: July 6, 1916
- Country: United States
- Language: Silent (English intertitles)

A Day at School is a 1916 American silent short comedy film featuring Oliver Hardy.

== Plot ==
According to a film magazine, "Ray is sent to boarding school. With the connivance of her maid, her lover is apprised of her destination and he goes to rescue his lady love. He succeeds in entering her room, but is seen by the inquisitive janitor, who informs the principal. A grand sortie is made by the whole school, but on bursting into Ray's room, nothing is seen but a man's hat and glove. This is conclusive evidence and the father is sent for.

Scared but undismayed, Plump dresses as a girl, is admitted as a pupil, and plans an elopement. The janitor intervenes and again the alarm is raised. An enterprising burglar chooses this moment for an entrance and he, alarmed by the commotion, hides in a closet. Their escape cut off, Plump and Ray dash into their room, and Plump takes refuge in the burglar's closet, from which he forces the crook.

Rushing through the assembled pupils the prowler dives through the window and meeting the father downs him, after stealing his clothes. This leaves open the way of escape and the lovers, jumping into the father's auto, wave a kiss as the crook climbs on behind, leaving dad now mistaken for the burglar to be almost annihilated by the excited girls."

== Cast ==
- Oliver Hardy as Plump (credited as Babe Hardy)
- Billy Ruge as Runt
- Joe Cohen as Father
- Ray Godfrey as Daughter
- Bert Tracy as Janitor
- Anna Mingus as Principal

== See also ==
- List of American films of 1916
- Oliver Hardy filmography
