= A Mix Up in Hearts =

1917 film

A Mix Up In Hearts
- Directed by: Oliver Hardy
- Produced by: Louis Burstein
- Starring: Oliver Hardy
- Release date: February 1917
- Country: United States
- Languages: Silent film English intertitles

A Mix Up In Hearts is a 1917 silent comedy film featuring Oliver Hardy. The film was produced by the Vim Comedy Company and shot in Jacksonville, Florida.

== Plot ==
Although the title appears in books about him, there is no evidence of it in the usual film magazines such as The Moving Picture World, and no plot summary is available.

== Cast ==
- Ethel Marie Burton (as Ethel Burton)
- Oliver Hardy (as Babe Hardy)

== See also ==
- List of American films of 1917
