= The Daddy of Them All =

1914 film

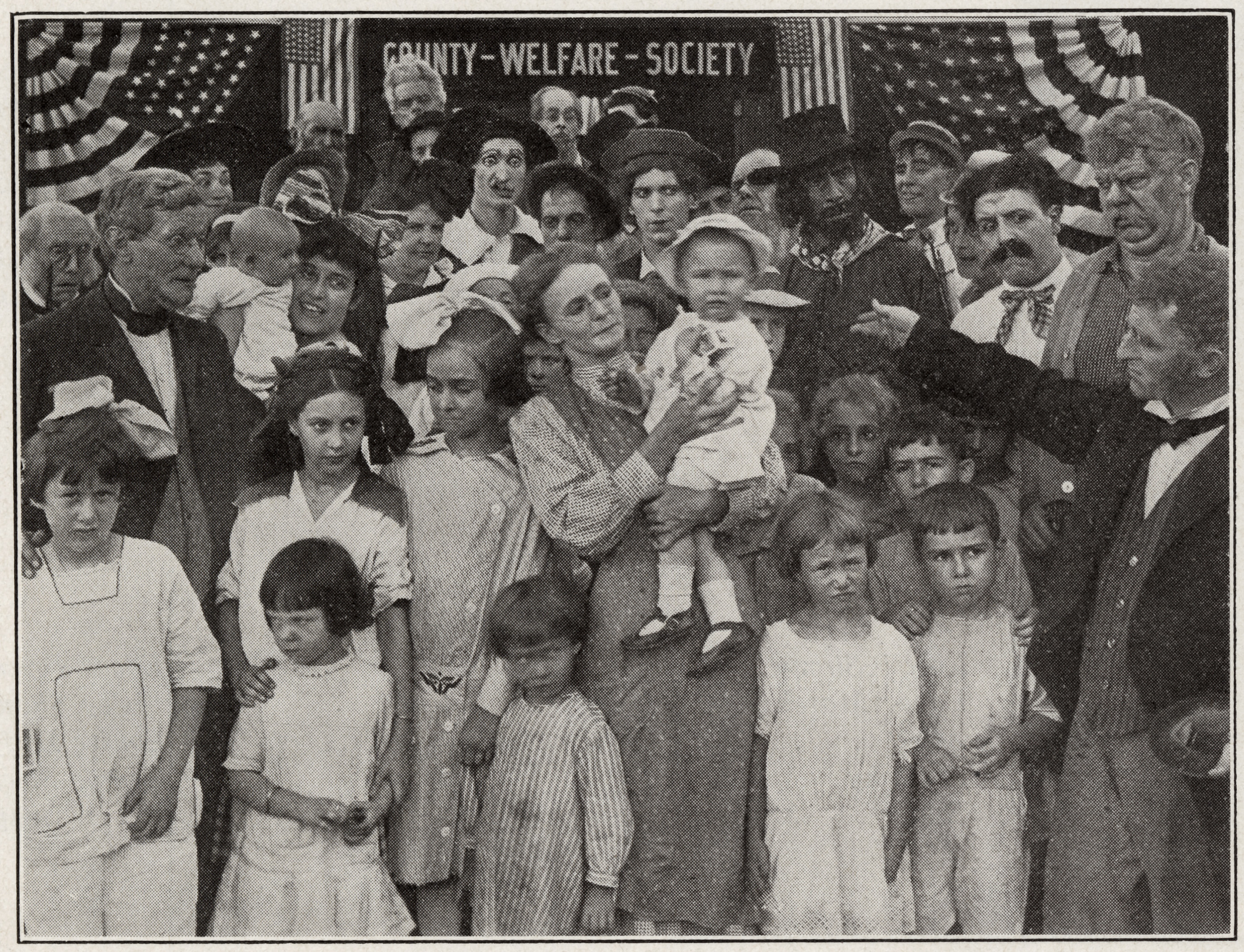
- Publicity still with the cast of The Daddy of Them All
- Written by: Frank Andrews
- Produced by: Arthur Hotaling
- Starring: Bert Tracy; Eva Bell
- Release date: November 21, 1914
- Running time: 6–7 minutes (c. 600 feet)
- Country: United States
- Languages: Silent film English intertitles

The Daddy of Them All is a 1914 American split-reel silent comedy film produced by the Lubin Manufacturing Company and starring Bert Tracy and Eva Bell, along with Harry Lorraine, Billy Bowers, Oliver Hardy, and James Levering.

== Plot ==
Ezra, a small man with a large family, hears about a competition being held by the County Welfare Society with a thousand-dollar prize for the father of most children. Since he has twenty-three of them, he thinks he has a good chance to win, but when he appears at the society office to make his case, the other fathers, all big men, laugh him off because he is such a runt. The judges require proof, so he runs home, gathers up the wife and children, and returns to claim the prize, which his wife immediately takes for herself. He is even more dismayed when a head count reveals a total of thirty-three children instead of twenty-three.

== Cast ==
- Bert Tracy as Ezra Jenkins (billed as H. Tracy)
- Eva Bell as Mrs. Jenkins
- Royal Byron as Michael Muldoon (as Roy Byron)
- Harry Lorraine as Hez Whipple
- Vincente DePascale as Pietro Olivatto (billed as V. Pascale)
- Oliver Hardy as Peitzheimer (billed as Babe Hardy)
- Billy Bowers as Chairman
- James Levering as Secretary

== Production and reception ==
The Daddy of Them All was written by Frank C. Andrews and produced by Arthur Hotaling, who was the general supervisor of the Jacksonville, Florida unit of the Lubin Manufacturing Company of Philadelphia. It was a short split-reel comedy, lasting approximately six or seven minutes and sharing a single reel of film with The Tale of a Coat, an unrelated comedy starring J. A. Murphy and Mabel Paige. The films were released by the General Film Company on November 21, 1914, and are among a group of short comedies made by the Lubin company in 1914 and early 1915 that include the earliest screen appearances of Oliver Hardy. In this film Hardy plays one of the larger and more obviously virile fathers whose child count is bested by the much smaller Tracy.

The film received favorable reviews in the trade papers. Moving Picture World described it as "a very funny comedy that is greeted with continuous laughter" and "well acted, in a reasonable way", while the critic for The Bioscope wrote "Really good short length comic. The results of the various efforts to produce evidence enough to win a big price, this for the largest family in town, are sufficient funny. When little Peters [sic] produces his bunch and wins hands down, the round trip of his flock makes an amusing finale". The review in the New York Dramatic Mirror singled out a scene in which Tracy whistles from his front porch and countless children come running to be fed.

== See also ==
- List of American films of 1914
- Oliver Hardy filmography
