= Walter Stull =

American actor

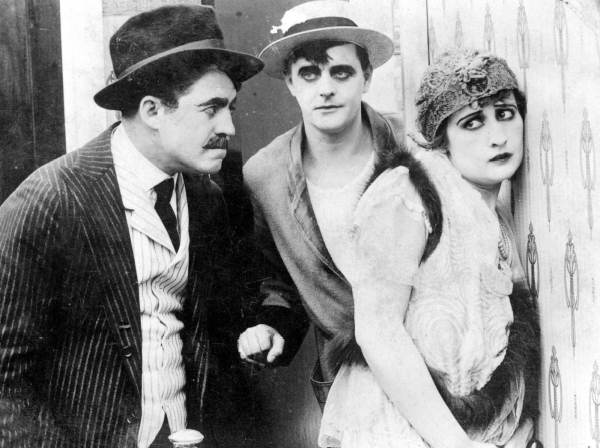
- Still with Walter Stull, Harry Myers, and Rosemary Theby in an unidentified 1916 film
- Born: January 27, 1879; Nebraska, United States
- Died: June 10, 1961 (aged 82); Los Angeles, California, United States
- Occupation: Actor
- Years active: 1911–1917

Walter Stull (January 27, 1879 – June 10, 1961) was an American film actor and director. He appeared in more than 90 films between 1912 and 1916 as well as directing 13 films between 1915 and 1916. He was born in Nebraska, and died in Los Angeles, California.

He played Jabbs (sometimes spelled Jabs) in the Pokes and Jabs silent comedies of the mid-1910s, with Bobby Burns as Pokes and frequently featuring Babe (Oliver) Hardy. He later appeared briefly as Finn with Billy Ruge as Haddie in the Finn and Haddie comedies.

== Selected filmography ==
- His Little Sister (1912) as Hans
- Pokes and Jabs (1915) as Jabs
- The Tangles of Pokes and Jabs (1915) as Jabs
- Two for a Quarter (1915) as Jabs
- One Busy Day (1915) as Jabs
- A Quiet Day (1915) as Jabs
- Mashers and Splashers (1915) as Jabs
- Juggling the Truth (1915) as Jabs
- In Clover (1915) as Jabs
- The Midnight Prowlers (1915) as Jabs
- Pressing Business (1915) as Jabs
- Love, Pepper and Sweets (1915) as Jabs
- Strangled Harmony (1915) as Jabbs
- Speed Kings (1915) as Jabs
- Mixed and Fixed (1915) as Jabs
- Ups and Downs (1915) as Jabs
- This Way Out (1916) as Jabs
- Chickens (1916) as Jabs
- Frenzied Finance (1916) as Jabs
- Busted Hearts (1916) as Jabs
- The Getway (1916) as Jabs
- The High Sign (1916) as Jabs
- Pluck and Luck (1916) as Jabs
- Love and Lather (1916) as Jabs
- Hired and Fired (1916) as Jabs
- The Try Out (1916) as Jabs
