= Louis Burstein =

American film producer

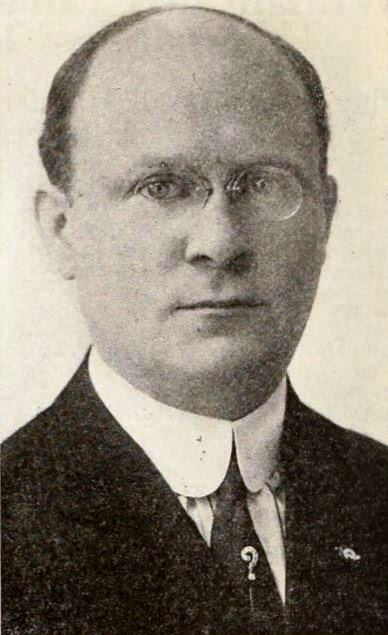
Louis Burstein December 1919

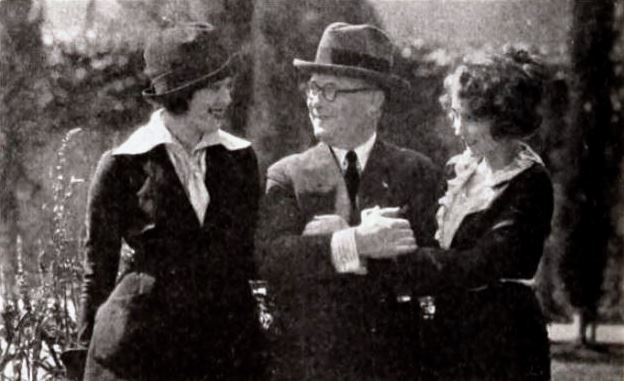
Myrtle Lind, Louis Burstein, and Bessie Love

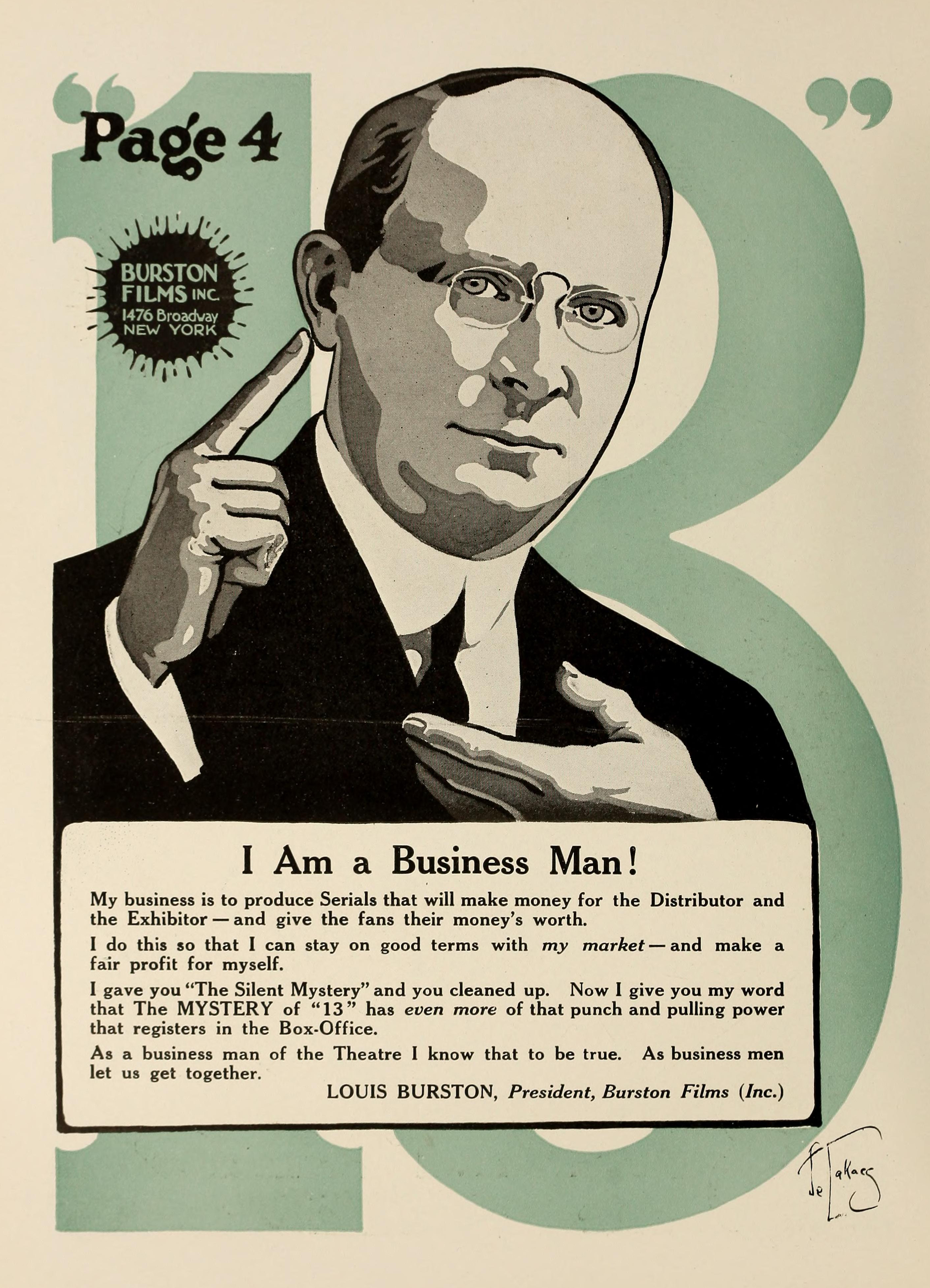
"I am a Business Man"

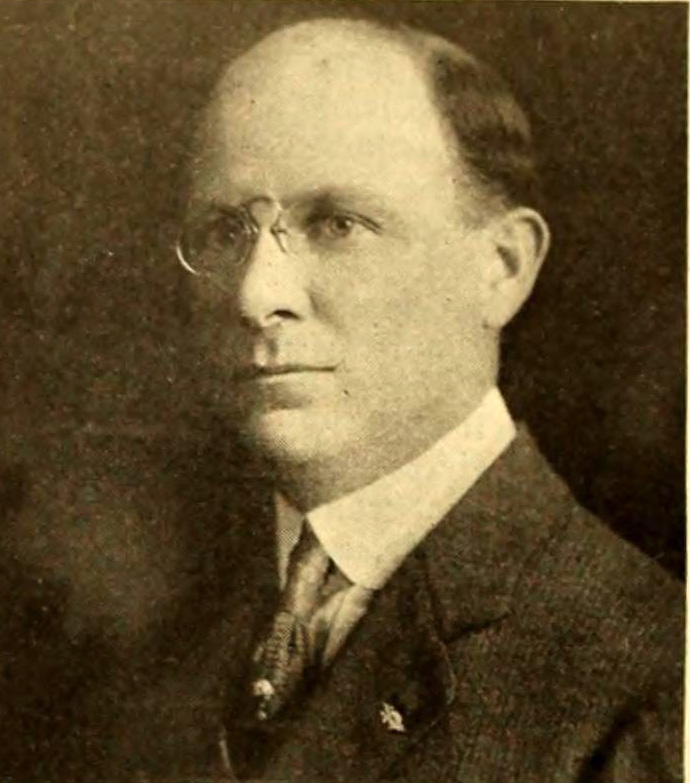

Louis Burstein (1878 – March 25, 1923), sometimes credited as Louis Burston, was a film producer. He co-founded Vim Comedy Company. He was born in Russia.

He led Vim and King-Bee filming operations in Jacksonville, Florida.

Burstein died on March 25, 1923. He had been driving a car and racing a Southern Pacific train near Pomona, California, when the road curved and the train struck his car. One of his passengers, Thomas Truxton Strain, died; the other, Grace A. Farr, was injured.

== Selected filmography ==
- Better Halves (film) (1916)
- The Other Girl (1917)
- Bright and Early (1918)
