= Dough Nuts =

1917 film

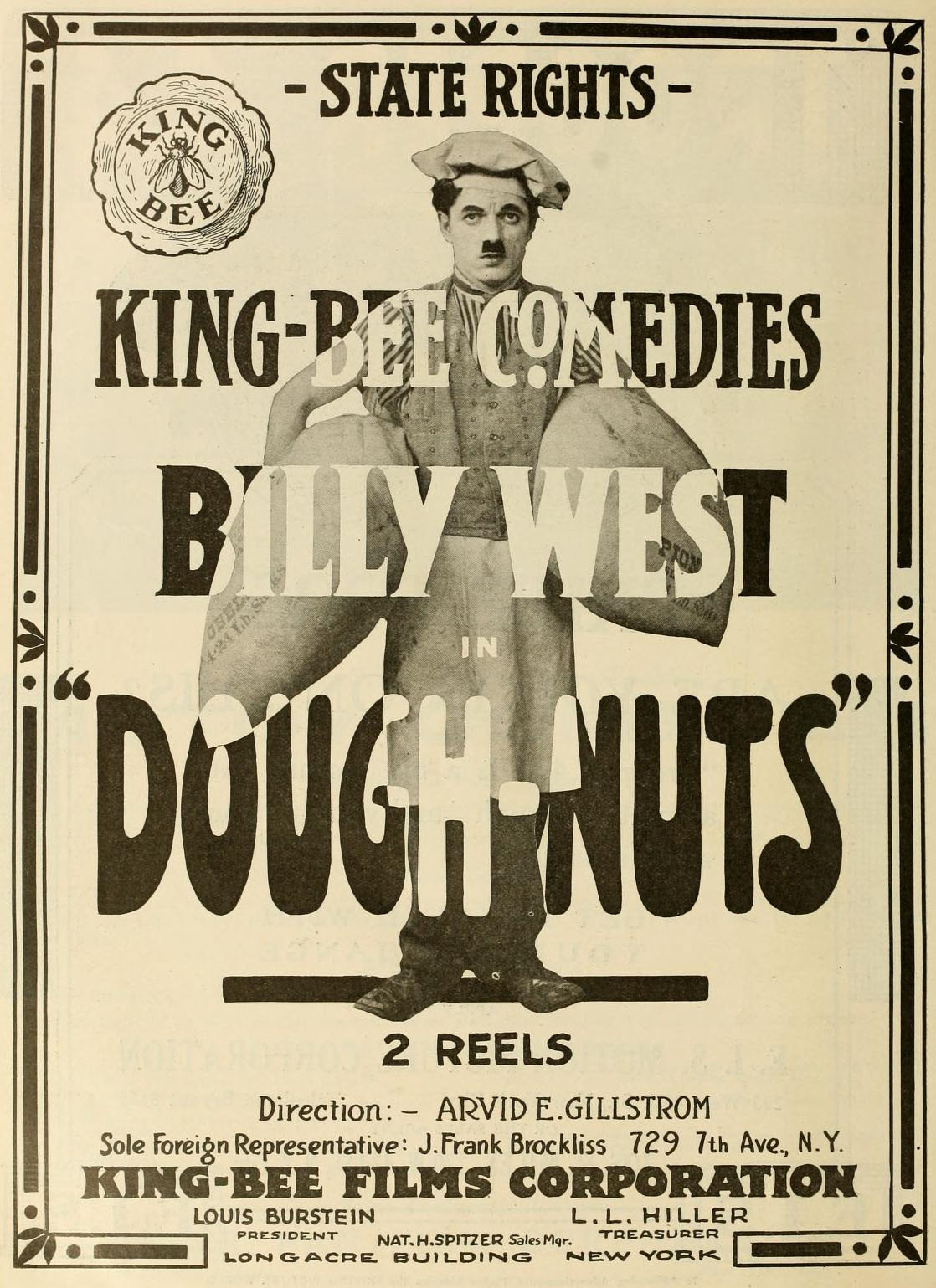
- Trade advertisement for film
- Directed by: Arvid E. Gillstrom
- Produced by: Louis Burstein
- Starring: Billy West; Oliver Hardy
- Cinematography: Herman Obrock Jr.
- Edited by: Ben H. Cohen
- Release date: June 15, 1917
- Running time: 2 reels
- Country: United States
- Languages: Silent film English intertitles

Dough Nuts is a 1917 American 2-reel silent comedy film featuring Oliver Hardy. Hardy was from Georgia, and some theaters there promoted the comedy as featuring a local. Historian Blair Miller compared this film to Charlie Chaplin's earlier film Dough and Dynamite. It was also known as The Bakery, and no copyright was registered.. It is not known whether the film currently survives.

== Plot ==
This plot summary was published in the Moving Picture World newspaper:

It was not Ethel's fault that she caused hostilities between all the men at Camebert's Bakery and Lunch Room. She simply had to flirt with men and every man she smiled at swore to have her as his own or die. When, however, Pierre, the excitable Italian baker tried to force Ethel to keep away from Babe, the sweet young cashier refused, and told Pierre many things not exactly complimentary. So when Billy happened to enter the bakery in search of a "hand out" he interrupted Pierre in the gentle game of choking Ethel. Billy hands Pierre a few swift jolts that result in the undoing of Pierre, much to the delight of Ethel and Camebert, the proprietor. After a few smiles from Ethel, Billy hires himself as a baker, thereby immediately incurring the hostility of Babe. Billy attempts feats of bakery unheard of, and succeeds in making the most wonderful designs in pies and crullers. Everything goes fine until Billy pushes the boob into the bake ovens, causing the boob's trousers to catch fire. Then in the attempt to quench the flames, Billy manages to drench the proprietor with a bucket of water. These little things help to put Billy in wrong with everybody but Ethel, who still smiles at him. The real trouble occurs when Babe discovers that Ethel has not only flirted with Billy but has actually kissed him. Babe allies himself on the side of Camebert and the Boob, and all three declare war on the hapless Billy. Billy succeeds in passing through the blockade and reaches the bakery intent only on "safety first." In the bakery, however, he finds escape cut off by Pierre and a pal who have returned to blow up the establishment. With the two forces closing down on him, Billy is powerless and only by use of judicious sprinting and good headwork did Billy finally manage to escape.

== Cast ==
- Billy West as Billy, the New Baker
- Ethel Marie Burton as Ethel, the Cashier (as Ethel Burton)
- Oliver Hardy as Babe, the chef (as Babe Hardy)
- Leo White as Camembert, the Proprietor
- Bud Ross as Boob, the Assistant (as Budd Ross)
- Florence McLaughlin as Waitress (as Florence McLoughlin)
- Joe Cohen as Pierre
- Frank Bates as His Pal

== See also ==
- List of American films of 1917
- Oliver Hardy filmography
