= The Brave Ones =

1916 film

- Directed by: Will Louis
- Produced by: Louis Burstein
- Starring: Oliver Hardy
- Release date: May 4, 1916
- Running time: 11 minutes
- Country: United States
- Languages: Silent film English intertitles

The Brave Ones is a 1916 American silent comedy film featuring Oliver Hardy.

== Plot ==
After they are caught stealing food, the sheriff (Billy Bletcher) sentences Plump (Oliver Hardy) and Runt (Billy Ruge) to spend the night in a haunted house. They are not alone, though, as the house is actually a hideout for a gang of counterfeiters.

== Cast ==
- Oliver Hardy - Plump (as Babe Hardy)
- Billy Ruge - Runt
- Billy Bletcher - The Sheriff
- Elsie MacLeod - The Sheriff's daughter (as Elsie McLeod)

== See also ==
- List of American films of 1916
- Oliver Hardy filmography
