= Boots! Boots! =

1934 British film by Bert Tracy

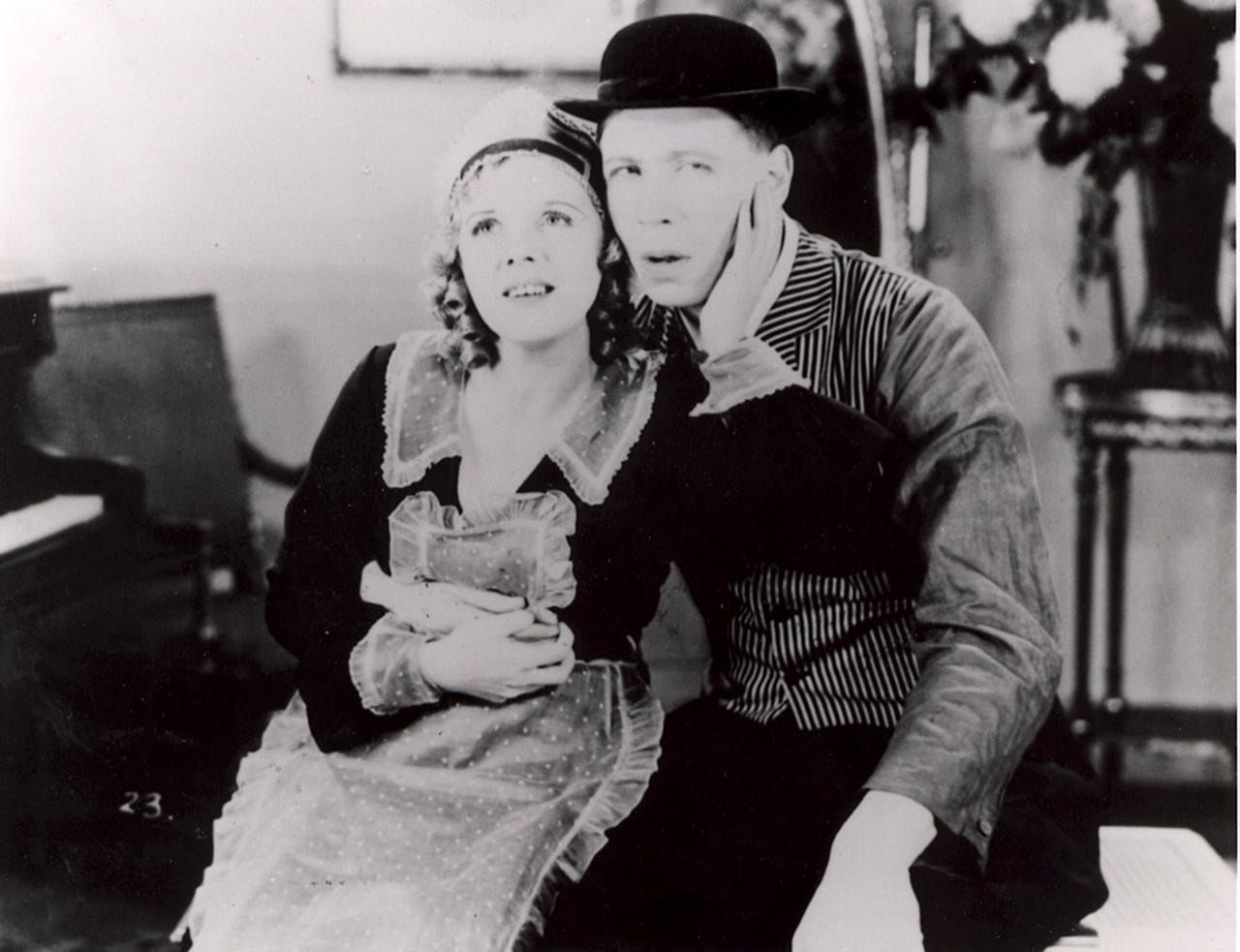
- Beryl Formby and George Formby
- Directed by: Bert Tracy
- Written by: George Formby; Arthur Mertz
- Produced by: John E. Blakeley
- Starring: George Formby; Beryl Formby; Arthur Kingsley
- Production companies: Blakeley's Productions, Ltd
- Release date: 1934
- Running time: 50 minutes
- Country: United Kingdom
- Language: English

Boots! Boots! is a 1934 British comedy film directed by Bert Tracy and starring George Formby, Beryl Formby, and Arthur Kingsley. It was written by Formby, Arthur Mertz and Jack Cottrill, and made by Blakeley's Productions, Ltd (later Mancunian Films) at the Albany Studios in London. The premiere of the film was in Burslem, Stoke-on-Trent.

== Cast ==
- George Formby as John Willie
- Beryl Formby as Snooky
- Arthur Kingsley as hotel manager
- Tonie Forde as chambermaid
- Lilian Keyes as Lady Royston
- Donald Read as Sir Alfred Royston
- Constance Fletcher as Mrs Clifford
- Betty Driver as Betty
- Wallace Bosco as Mr Clifford
- Myfanwy Southern as reception clerk
- Bert Tracey as the chef
- Harry Hudson and his Orchestra as themselves

== Production ==
Producer John E. Blakeley had no prior experience in film production; he had seen comedian George Formby doing his stage act and approached him to star in a feature film. Blakeley's modest studio was a one-room loft space above a taxi garage. The makeshift stage was not soundproofed, so whenever the crew members wanted to film a scene, they had to signal the garage to stop its noisy work below. The studio also had pictorial limitations, and could not replicate much more than simple room interiors (many scenes were staged in cramped corners). Thus the nightclub scenes in Boots! Boots! were filmed in near-darkness, hiding the absence of set decorations, with a single spotlight trained on the performer being photographed.

The film is a patchwork of songs and jokes tied to the misadventures of bumbling John Willie, played by Formby. ("John Willie" was a character made famous by Formby's father, George Formby Sr., in music halls of the early 1900s.) Despite the crude photography and recording, and the minuscule budget of £3,000, Boots! Boots! became an enormous hit. It was reissued in 1938, in a shortened 55-minute form, to capitalise on Formby's later fame; for six decades this abridged version was the only one in circulation, until an uncut, 80-minute print was located and restored for DVD release.

== Reception ==
The Daily Film Renter wrote: "Touring musical revue show brought lock, stock and barrel to screen. Without pretending to any high filmic quality, carries all the entertainment such a show is expected to provide, with songs, dances, broad comedy and bare suggestion of coherent plot. Obviously not intended for better class consumption in more sophisticated spots, picture is nevertheless one which will find big appeal in the industrial areas, particularly the North, with star's name as obvious drawing card."

Picturegoer wrote: "Formby is good, and with better material he should show to really good advantage; he has a good sense of the ridiculous, and puts over his songs well."
