= Back to the Farm =

1914 film

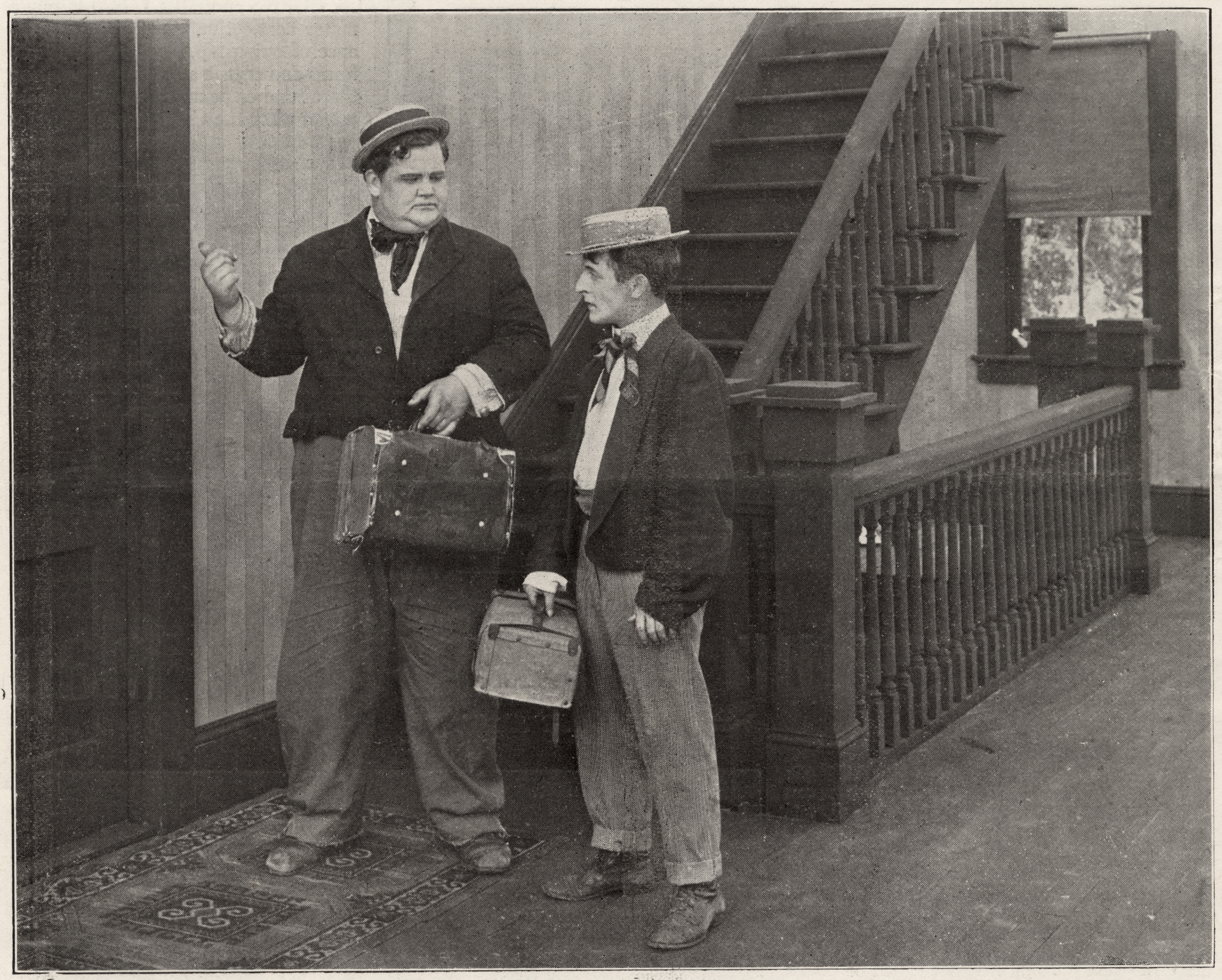
- Babe Hardy and Bert Tracy in a publicity still from Back to the Farm
- Directed by: Will Louis and Joseph Levering
- Written by: Will Louis
- Produced by: Siegmund Lubin
- Starring: Oliver Hardy; Bert Tracy
- Distributed by: Lubin Manufacturing Company
- Release date: August 18, 1914
- Running time: Listed "about 1,000 feet" (approximately 12 minutes)
- Country: United States
- Languages: Silent film English intertitles

Back to the Farm is a 1914 silent comedy short film produced by the Lubin Manufacturing Company and co-starring Oliver Hardy and Bert Tracy. It is the earliest Hardy film known to survive.

== Plot ==
Tom and Bob, two country boys, want to visit their aunt, who lives in the city. She writes to tell them that she will not be home when they arrive, but the key will be under the mat. The boys accidentally go to the wrong apartment, but they find a key under the mat and naturally assume that it belongs to their aunt. They let themselves in, enjoy a good meal, and go to bed. When Mr and Mrs. Cassett, the occupants of the apartment, arrive home and find the boys sleeping in their bedroom, they grab guns and chase them out. The police arrive and arrests are made, but the confusion is cleared up by the aunt. The boys decide that city life is too nerve-wracking and return to the farm.

== Cast ==
- Oliver Hardy as Tom (billed as Babe Hardy)
- Bert Tracy as Bob (billed as Herbert Tracey)
- Roy Byron as Mr. Cassett
- Mabel Paige as Mrs. Cassett
- Eloise Willard as Auntie

== Production and reception ==
Back to the Farm was filmed in Jacksonville, Florida, at the Jacksonville unit of the Lubin Manufacturing Company of Pennsylvania, under the general supervision of Arthur Hotaling. It was released by the General Film Company on August 18, 1914. The film was written by Will Louis, and directed by Louis in collaboration with Joseph Levering.

According to film historian Rob Stone, Back to the Farm is the earliest Oliver Hardy film known to still exist. Hardy had already appeared in a number of short split-reel comedies made at Lubin's Jacksonville studio in the spring and summer of 1914, but this was his first full one-reeler, as well as his first appearance with Bert Tracy, who was a close friend and colleague of Hardy's during his time at Lubin and later at the Vim studio.

The film was well received in the trade papers. Moving Picture World noted briefly, "There is considerable legitimate comedy in this picture and it receives much laughter." The review in Motion Picture News described the disarming effect of the childish personalities of Tom and Bob in potentially objectionable or bawdy scenes: "The adventures of Tom and Bob would be risqué if they were not such simpletons and so awfully innocent of guilt in the situations which they create when they come to town to visit their aunt and get in the wrong house. As it is, what happens to them is ludicrous and will cause inordinate laughter."

== See also ==
- List of American films of 1914
- Oliver Hardy filmography
