= Beryl Ingham =

British dancer and talent manager (1901–1960)

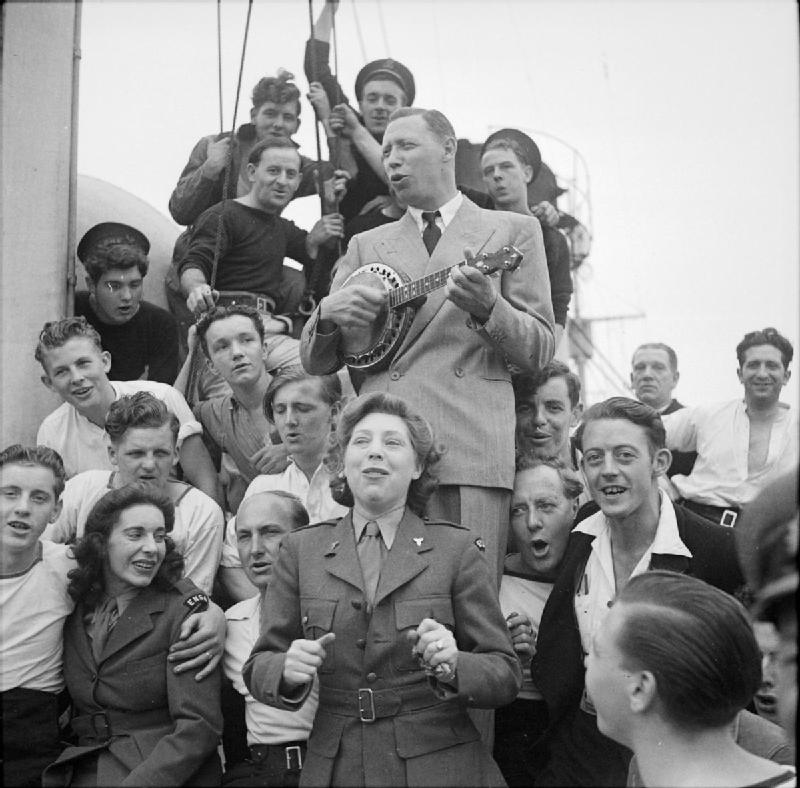
- Ingham with Formby entertaining the crew of HMS Ambitious, off the Normandy coast in 1944
- Born: 1901; Haslingden, Lancashire, England
- Died: 25 December 1960 (aged 58–59); Blackpool, Lancashire, England
- Known for: Manager and wife of George Formby, performer, and clogdancer
- Spouse: George Formby (m. 1924)

Beryl Ingham (9 September 1901 – 24 December 1960) was the wife and manager of singer/actor George Formby, as well as being a variety performer and champion clogdancer.

She was born in Haslingden, Lancashire, the youngest daughter of John James Ingham and his wife Elizabeth Ann (née Jackson). At the age of 11 she won the All-England Step Dancing Title. Later she formed a dancing act with her sister May, calling themselves The Two Violets.

She met George Formby in 1923, while they were appearing in a music hall in Yorkshire. They married in his hometown of Wigan the following year. The couple worked together as a variety act until 1932, when she became his full-time manager and mentor.

In 1934, film producer John E. Blakeley, who had admired their double act, engaged them for work on a low-budget comic movie, Boots! Boots!, where Beryl's domineering manner on the set was noticed for the first time, especially by the teenage Betty Driver, with whom she feuded. In later films, producer Basil Dean avoided visiting the studio during filming, and director Monty Banks tried to get her banned from the set. She made only two minor appearances in the Formby films.

The Formbys went on a tour of South Africa in 1946; despite threats from the National Party leader Daniel Malan, George played to black audiences, and Beryl embraced a three-year-old black girl who had presented her with a box of chocolates. Malan had them thrown out of the country and was reported to have told them to "Never come back here again". Beryl replied "Why don't you piss off, you horrible little man?"

She continued to manage George's career until she developed leukemia; she died on Christmas Day 1960 in Blackpool. George Formby died ten weeks after his wife.

== Selected filmography ==
- Boots! Boots! (1934)
