= Ups and Downs (1915 film) =

1915 film

- Directed by: Bobby Burns; Walter Stull
- Produced by: Louis Burstein
- Starring: Bobby Burns
- Release date: December 31, 1915
- Country: United States
- Languages: Silent film English intertitles

Ups and Downs is a 1915 American silent comedy film featuring Oliver Hardy.

== Cast ==
- Bobby Burns as Pokes
- Walter Stull as Jabbs
- Oliver Hardy as Shifty Mike (as Babe Hardy)
- Ethel Marie Burton as Ethel
- Frank Hanson as Runt

== See also ==
- List of American films of 1915
