= Bobby Burns (actor) =

American actor and director (1878–1966)

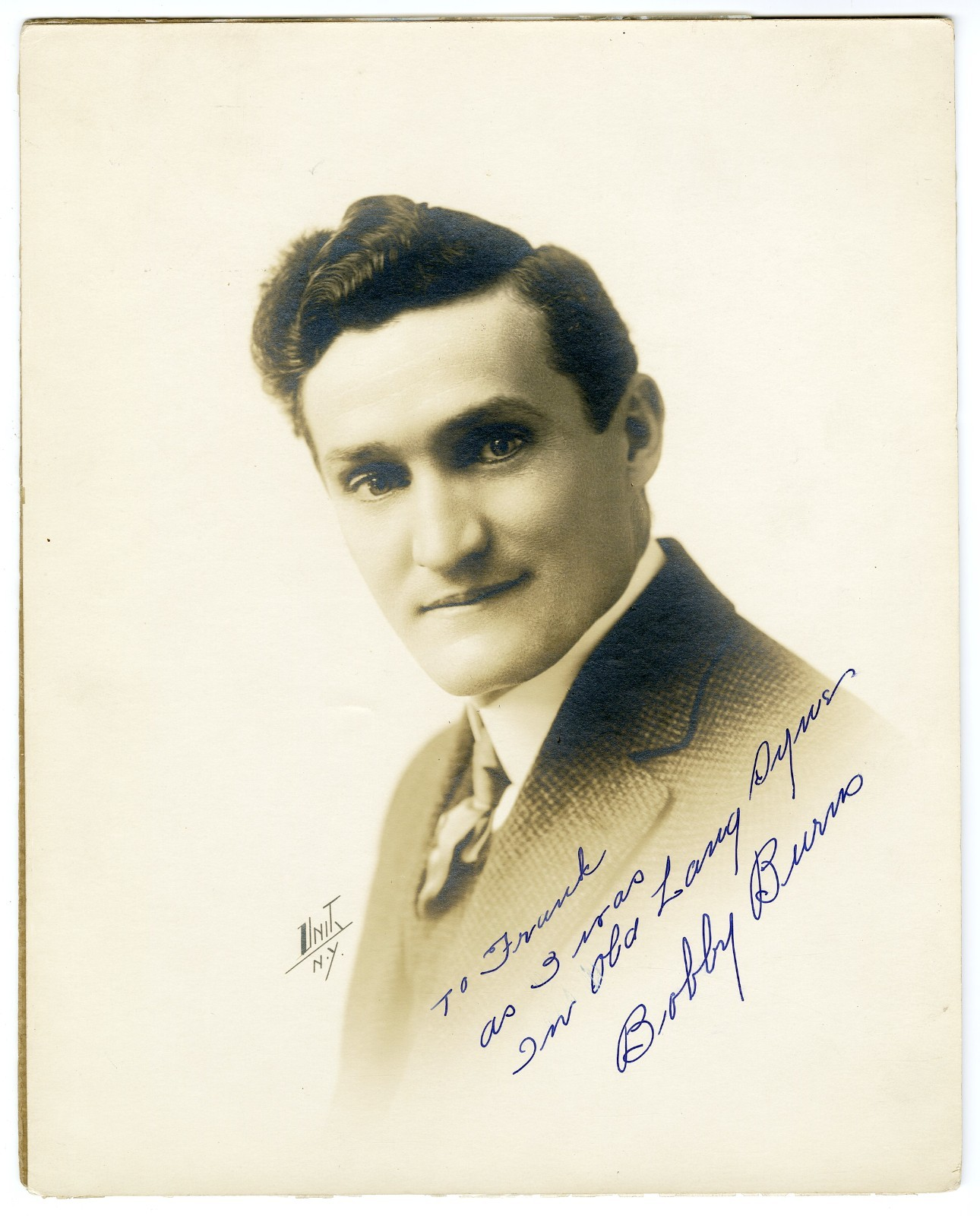
- Bobby Burns Inscribed Photo
- Born: Robert Paul Burns; September 1, 1878; Philadelphia, Pennsylvania
- Died: January 16, 1966 (aged 87); Los Angeles, California
- Occupations: Actor; Film director
- Years active: 1908–1952

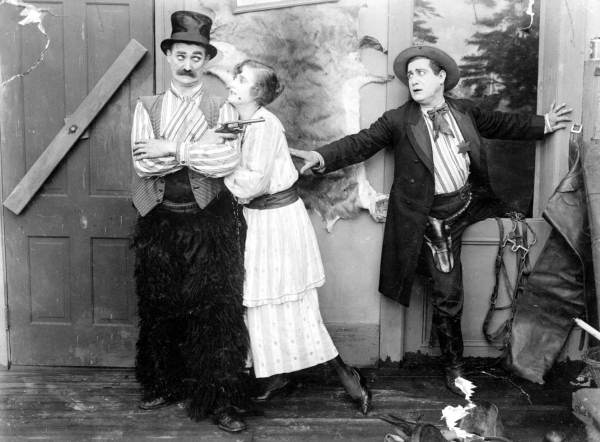
Film Still Showing Burns On The Left

Robert Paul Burns (September 1, 1878 – January 16, 1966) was an American film actor and director. He appeared in more than 200 films between 1908 and 1952 and also directed 13 films between 1915 and 1916.

Burns was born in Philadelphia, Pennsylvania, and died in Los Angeles, California.

== Career ==
Burns played Pokes in the Pokes and Jabbs silent comedies of the mid 1910s, with Walter Stull as Jabbs and frequently featuring Babe (Oliver) Hardy. Later he supported Hardy in his partnership with Stan Laurel at the Hal Roach Studios in several of their early short comedies and feature films.

== Selected filmography ==
- Uncivil War Birds (1946) as Union Soldier (uncredited)
- Gents Without Cents (1944) Audience Member (uncredited)
- Air Raid Wardens (1943) as Townsman in Gymnasium (uncredited)
- Loco Boy Makes Good (1942) as Nightclub Patron (uncredited)
- I'll Never Heil Again (1941) as King's aide (uncredited)
- Healthy, Wealthy and Dumb (1938) as Room service waiter (uncredited)
- Dizzy Doctors (1937) as Man in the Wheelchair (uncredited)
- Jail Bait (1937) as Prison Warden (uncredited)
- A Pain in the Pullman (1936) as Man in Berth (uncredited)
- Dummy Ache (1936) as Gardner (uncredited)
- Ants in the Pantry (1936) as Guest with mouse down his back (uncredited)
- Pop Goes the Easel (1935) as Professor Fueller (uncredited)
- Restless Knights (1935) as Guard (uncredited)
- Them Thar Hills (1934) as Officer (uncredited)
- Three Little Pigskins (1934) as Man panhandled by Larry (uncredited)
- Babes In Toyland (1934) as Townsman (uncredited)
- Helpmates (1932) as Neighbor with hose (uncredited)
- The Chimp (1932) as Tenant (uncredited)
- Any Old Port! (1932) as Justice of peace (uncredited)
- Pardon Us (1931) as Prisoner with toothache (uncredited)
- The Laurel-Hardy Murder Case (1930) as Nervous Relative (uncredited)
- Below Zero (1930) as "Blind" Man/Deadbeat diner (uncredited)
- Another Fine Mess (1930) as Bicyclist (uncredited)
- The Try Out (1916) as Pokes
- Hired and Fired (1916) as Pokes
- Busted Hearts (1916) as Pokes
- Frenzied Finance (1916) as Pokes
- Chickens (1916) as Pokes
- This Way Out (1916) as Pokes
- Ups and Downs (1915) as Pokes
- Mixed and Fixed (1915) as Pokes
- Speed Kings (1915) as Pokes
- Strangled Harmony (1915) as Pokes
- Love, Pepper and Sweets (1915) as Pokes
- Pressing Business (1915) as Pokes
- The Midnight Prowlers (1915) as Pokes
