= The Rich Slave =

1921 film

- Directed by: Romaine Fielding
- Written by: Lloyd Lonergan
- Production company: Jaxon Film Corp.
- Release date: 1921
- Country: United States
- Language: Silent

The Rich Slave is a silent film released in 1921. It was directed by Romaine Fielding and written by Lloyd Lonergan. It was a Jaxon Film Corp. productions.

== Plot ==
No. 17 is the only name of orphan Gladys Claypool in the unhappy charge, with others, of a brutal superintendent. Her freedom is sought, however, by financiers eager for the possession of some valuables to which she is entitled. A nurse agrees to help them in exchange for a sum of money, and the superintendent intervenes, hoping for a cut of the nurse's profit. The girl suffers greatly, and her life is threatened; but she meets a young man who helps her. He goes West, and the plotters try to remove him in a train wreck, but he survives to find the girl's grandfather and proof of her clear title to the disputed property.

== Cast ==
- Mabel Taliaferro - Gladys Claypool
- June Day - Claire Gage
- Romaine Fielding - Whitney Gage
- Joseph W. Smiley - Harrison Frayne
- Arthur Elton - Sneed
- Martha Forrest - Nurse

== Background ==
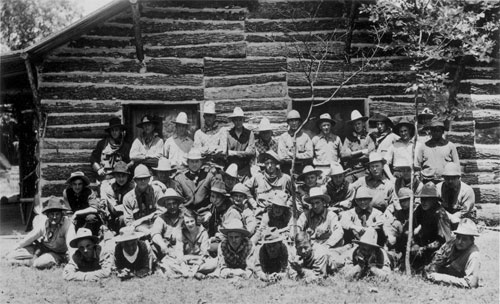
State Police officers wearing their Western cowboy garb

The State Polic records include a typed reminiscence of the event. Harriett Faussett Brogan wrote this undated memoir, titled “Early Michigan State Police Movie Heroes.” She stated that her father, Thomas J. Fausett, had formed a movie company with actor Romaine Fielding. Ms. Brogan noted that the company was based in Howell, Michigan, her father's hometown. She recalled that production of The Rich Slave began “about the middle of June 1917” and that much of the movie was filmed in Howell. According to Ms. Brogan, the State Police portrayed cowboys in some action shots, which were filmed “on land now known as Kensington Park near Brighton.” She further wrote, “There was a log cabin there owned by the Labardy family. And this is where the State Police made their debut as movie stars performing admirably all types of outstanding horsemanship.” (At that time, most State Police officers patrolled on horseback, so they were quite skilled at riding.) She noted that the cabin appeared in the film as the Buck Horn Hotel and that “Mr. Labardy also acted in one of the scenes.” Further research indicates that “Mr. Labardy” was likely either Oliver Labadie or his brother, Hubert. These were brothers of Jo Labadie, whose papers are housed at the University of Michigan. The Jo Labadie Collection Web site notes that Oliver and Hubert opened a film studio, which they named the Labadie-Detroit Motion Picture Company. The Web site lists some films made there, with The Rich Slave appearing on the list.
