= Chickens (1916 film) =

1916 film

- Directed by: Bobby Burns; Walter Stull
- Produced by: Louis Burstein
- Starring: Bobby Burns
- Distributed by: Vim Comedy Company
- Release date: January 14, 1916
- Country: United States
- Languages: Silent film English intertitles

Chickens is a 1916 American short silent comedy film featuring Oliver Hardy.

== Cast ==
- Bobby Burns as Pokes
- Walter Stull as Jabbs
- Oliver Hardy (as Babe Hardy)
- Frank Hanson
- Ethel Marie Burton

== See also ==
- List of American films of 1916
