= Thirty Days (1916 film) =

1916 film

- Directed by: Will Louis
- Produced by: Louis Burstein
- Starring: Oliver Hardy
- Release date: May 18, 1916
- Country: United States
- Languages: Silent film English intertitles

Thirty Days is a 1916 American silent comedy film featuring Oliver Hardy.

== Cast ==
- Oliver Hardy as Plump (as Babe Hardy)
- Billy Ruge as Runt
- Elsie MacLeod
- Florence McLaughlin
- Bert Tracy

== See also ==
- List of American films of 1916
