= Billy Ruge =

American actor

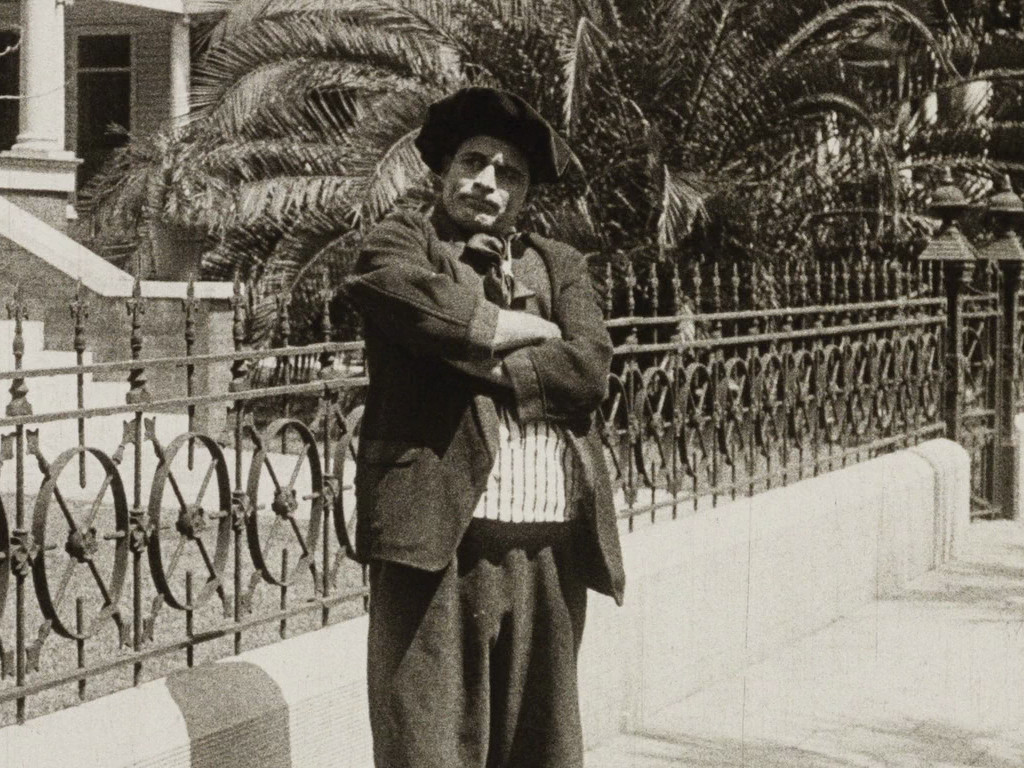
- Billy Ruge in Hungry Hearts (1916)
- Born: c. 1866/1870; New York City, New York, U.S.
- Died: October 19, 1955 (aged 85 or 89); New York City, New York, U.S.
- Occupation: Film actor
- Years active: c. 1899–1930
- Spouse: Anna

Billy Ruge (c. 1866/1870 – October 19, 1955) was an American film actor. His early career was spent as an aerial trapeze acrobat in an act with partner Bill Frobel: Ruge and Frobel played Montreal in 1899, and shared a bill at London's Hippodrome with W. C. Fields, Houdini, and Sandow over the Easter holiday of 1904. According to Ruge, prior to playing his first silent film part- for Edison- he had "just returned from a seven years' engagement in the variety houses of Germany, England, France, Russia, South America, Belgium, and Spain." Ruge eventually appeared in 64 films between 1915 and 1922, mostly one-reeler Comedy Shorts. He frequently worked for Actor/Director Willard Louis, filming in Jacksonville, Florida for the minor studios Lubin Studios, the Vim Comedy Company, and the Jaxon Film Corporation.

Ruge is best recalled for his films with Oliver "Babe" Hardy, playing the part of 'Runt' opposite Hardy's 'Plump' in what can be seen as a precursor to the more famous Stan and Ollie partnership. After 40 plus shorts, Hardy moved on, eventually to Hollywood, to play "heavies" for Billy West.

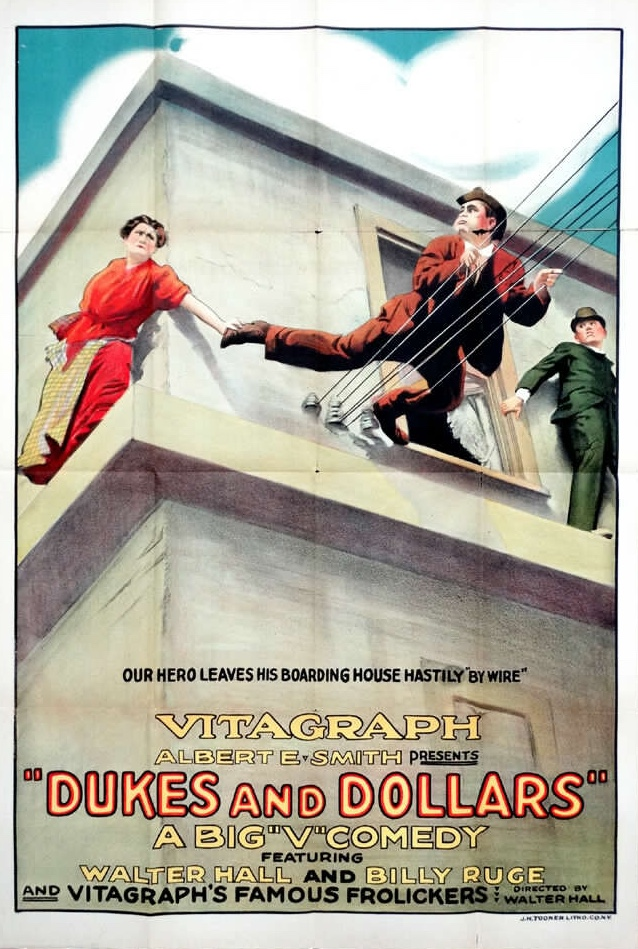
Dukes and Dollars (1918)

From 1917-1918, Ruge was joined briefly with Walter Stull as 'Haddie' in at least seven Finn and Haddie comedies, while concurrently partnered with Kate Price in a six film series of "Sparkle Comedies". Finally, after a few solo projects, he disappeared from the movie world, with his last five releases coming in 1922.

By May 1922, Ruge returned to vaudeville in an acrobatic comedy act ("Ruge and Rose") with new partner Joe Rose, booked for a year on the Loews Circuit. Ruge and Rose continued on until at least the early months of 1924, overcoming an initial trade review that labeled the team as "small timers" with "nothing really worth while to offer." At the start of the next decade, apparently shorn of Rose, Ruge toured in a positively-reviewed revival of Babes in Toyland.

A Billboard obituary reports Ruge died - "with no immediate survivors" - in 1955 at age 89 in New York City, which would indicate a birth year of 1866. However, a U. S. Census survey submitted for June 7, 1900 states that an "Actor" "William Ruge" - age 29, born August 1870 - was living in New York City with his "Actress"
wife of seven years, "Anna" - age 28, born November 1871.

== Selected filmography ==
- Chinks and Chickens (1915)
- Love, Pepper and Sweets (1915) - first partnership with Oliver Hardy
- Speed Kings (1915)
- The Brave Ones (1916)
- Hungry Hearts (1916)
- The Precious Parcel (1916)
- One Too Many (1916 film) (Link to Download)
- Week-End Shopping (1916)
- The Guilty Ones (1916) - Last collaboration with Oliver Hardy
- Ambition (1917) - co-starring with Kate Price
- Smashing the Plot (1918)
- Bone Dry Blues (1922)
