= Oliver Hardy =

American actor (1892–1957)

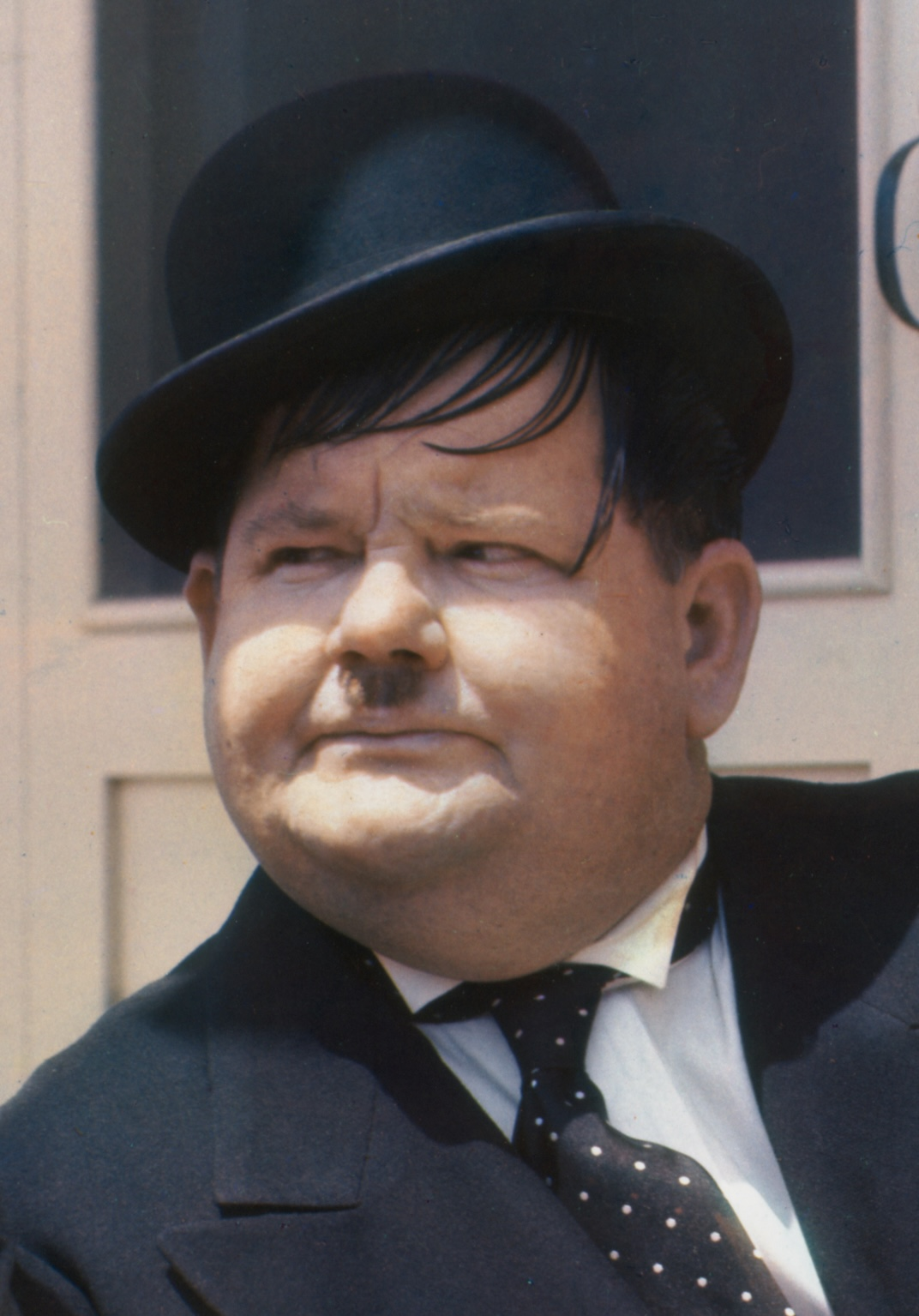
- Hardy in 1938
- Born: Norvell Hardy; January 18, 1892; Harlem, Georgia, U.S.
- Died: August 7, 1957 (aged 65); North Hollywood, Los Angeles, California, U.S.
- Resting place: Valhalla Memorial Park Cemetery, California, U.S.
- Other name: Babe Hardy
- Occupations: Actor; comedian; director; screenwriter
- Years active: 1914–1955
- Spouses: Madelyn Saloshin (m. 1913; div. 1921) Myrtle Reeves (m. 1921; div. 1937) Virginia Lucille Jones (m. 1940)

Oliver Norvell Hardy (born Norvell Hardy; January 18, 1892 – August 7, 1957) was an American comic actor and one half of Laurel and Hardy, the double act that began in the era of silent films and lasted from 1927 to 1955. He appeared with his comedy partner Stan Laurel in 107 short films, feature films, and cameo roles. He was credited with his first film, Outwitting Dad, in 1914. In most of his silent films before joining producer Hal Roach, he was billed on screen as Babe Hardy.

== Early life and education ==
Oliver Hardy was born Norvell Hardy on January 18, 1892, in Harlem, Georgia. His father, Oliver, was a Confederate States Army veteran of the American Civil War who had been wounded at the Battle of Antietam on September 17, 1862, and was a recruiting officer for Company K, 16th Georgia Regiment. The elder Oliver Hardy assisted his father in running the remnants of the family's cotton plantation. He then bought a share in a retail business and was elected full-time Tax Collector for Columbia County, Georgia. Hardy's mother, Emily Norvell, was the daughter of Thomas Benjamin Norvell, who was descended from Hugh Norvell of Williamsburg, Virginia, and Mary Freeman. The elder Hardy and Norvell married March 12, 1890; it was her second marriage and his third.

The family moved to Madison, Georgia, in 1891, the year before Norvell's birth. He was likely born in Harlem, though some sources say that his birth occurred in Covington, Georgia, his mother's hometown. His father died less than a year after his birth. Hardy was the youngest of five children. His older brother Sam drowned in the Oconee River; Hardy pulled him from the river but was unable to resuscitate him.

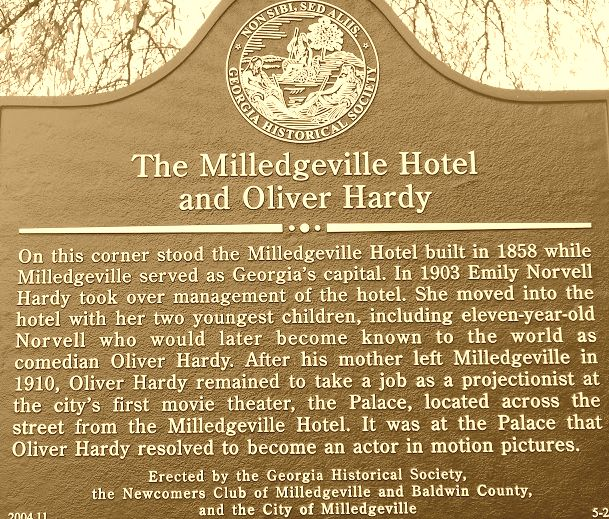
Historical marker in Milledgeville, Georgia, that tells the story of Hardy's time in that town

As a child, Hardy was sometimes difficult. In the fifth grade he was sent to Georgia Military College in Milledgeville. In 1905, at age 13, he enrolled in the fall semester of the junior high school division at Young Harris College in north Georgia, which he completed successfully in January 1906. At that time, there were no two-year junior colleges. He had little interest in formal education, although he acquired an early interest in music and theater. He joined a theatrical group and later ran away from a boarding school near Atlanta to sing with the group. His mother recognized his talent for singing and sent him to Atlanta to study music and voice with singing teacher Adolf Dahm-Petersen. He skipped some of his lessons to sing in the Alcazar Theater for $3.50 a week. In 1912, he signed up for a course or two at University of Georgia as a law major for fall semester just to play football. He never missed a game.

As a teenager, Hardy began styling himself "Oliver Norvell Hardy", adding the first name "Oliver" as a tribute to his father. He appeared as "Oliver N. Hardy" in the 1910 U.S. census, (Note: He was recorded as "Oliver M. Hardy" (not "N"), an "electrician" at an "electric theater". He was mistakenly listed as the "son" of Roy J. Baisden in his census listing.) and he used "Oliver" as his first name in all subsequent legal records, marriage announcements, etc. Hardy was initiated into Freemasonry at Solomon Lodge No. 20 in Jacksonville, Florida which helped him with room and board when he was starting out in show business. He was inducted into the Grand Order of Water Rats along with Stan Laurel.

== Career ==
=== Early career ===
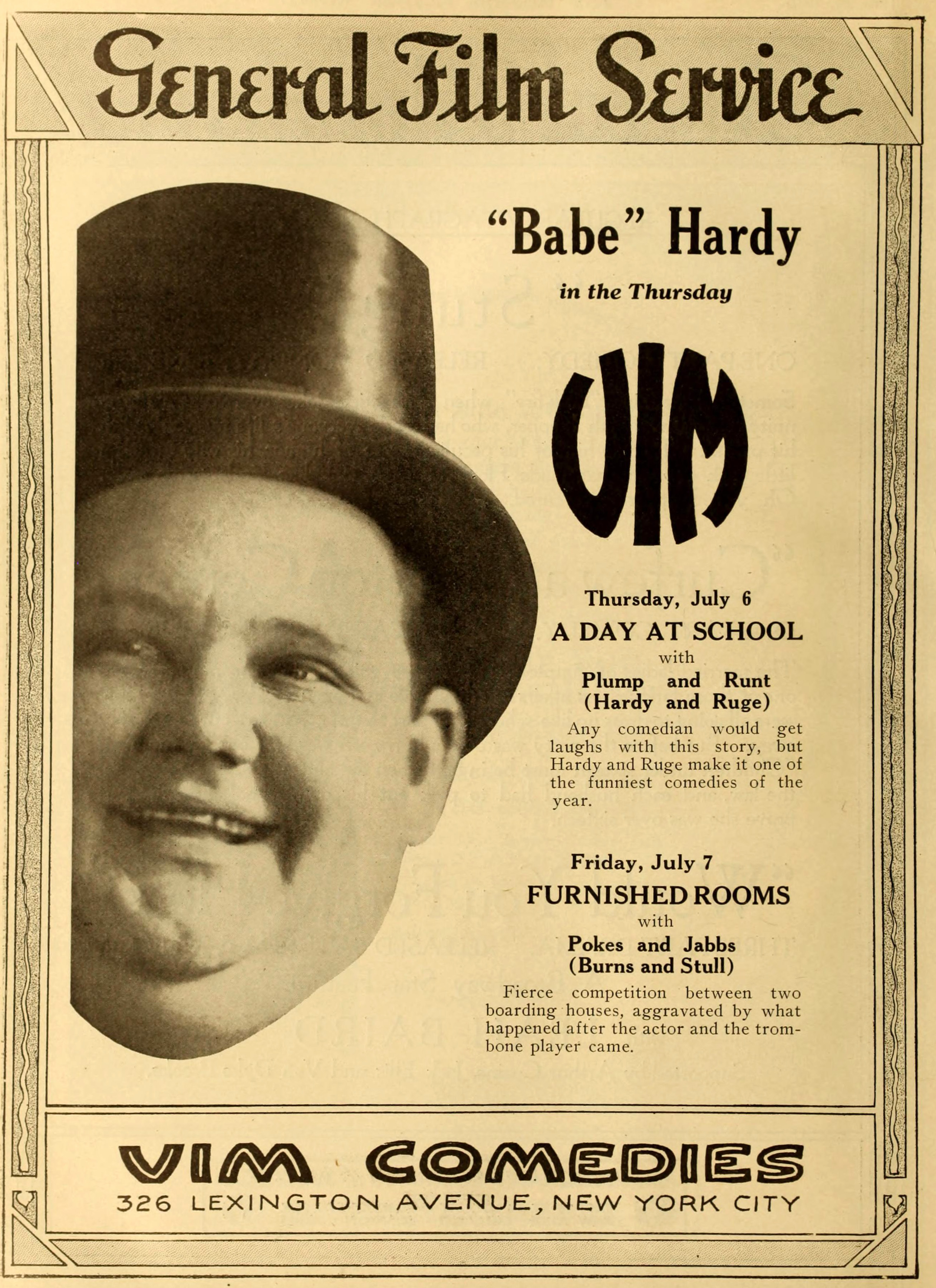
Advertisement with Hardy for A Day at School (1916), part of the Plump & Runt series

In 1910, The Palace, a motion picture theater, opened in Hardy's hometown of Milledgeville, and he became the projectionist, ticket taker, janitor and manager. He soon became obsessed with the new motion picture industry and was convinced that he could do a better job than the actors that he saw. A friend suggested that he move to Jacksonville, Florida, where some films were being made, which he did in 1913. He worked in Jacksonville as a cabaret and vaudeville singer at night and at the Lubin Manufacturing Company during the day. It was at this time that he met Madelyn Saloshin, a pianist, whom he married on November 17, 1913, in Macon, Georgia.

The next year, he made his first movie, Outwitting Dad (1914), for the Lubin studio, billed as O. N. Hardy. In his personal life, he was known as "Babe" Hardy and was billed as "Babe Hardy" in many of his later films at Lubin, such as Back to the Farm (1914). He was a big man, standing 6 feet 1 inch (1.85 m) and weighing up to 300 pounds (c. 136 kg), and his size placed limits on the roles that he could play. He was most often cast as the villain, but he also had roles in comedy shorts, his size complementing the character. By 1915, Hardy had made 50 short one-reel films at Lubin. He moved to New York and made films for the Pathé, Casino and Edison Studios. He returned to Jacksonville, where he made films for the Vim Comedy Company. That studio closed after Hardy discovered that the owners were stealing from the payroll. He then worked for the King Bee studio, which bought Vim, and worked with Billy Ruge, Billy West (a Charlie Chaplin imitator), and comedic actress Ethel Burton. He continued playing the villains for West well into the early 1920s, often imitating Eric Campbell to West's Chaplin.

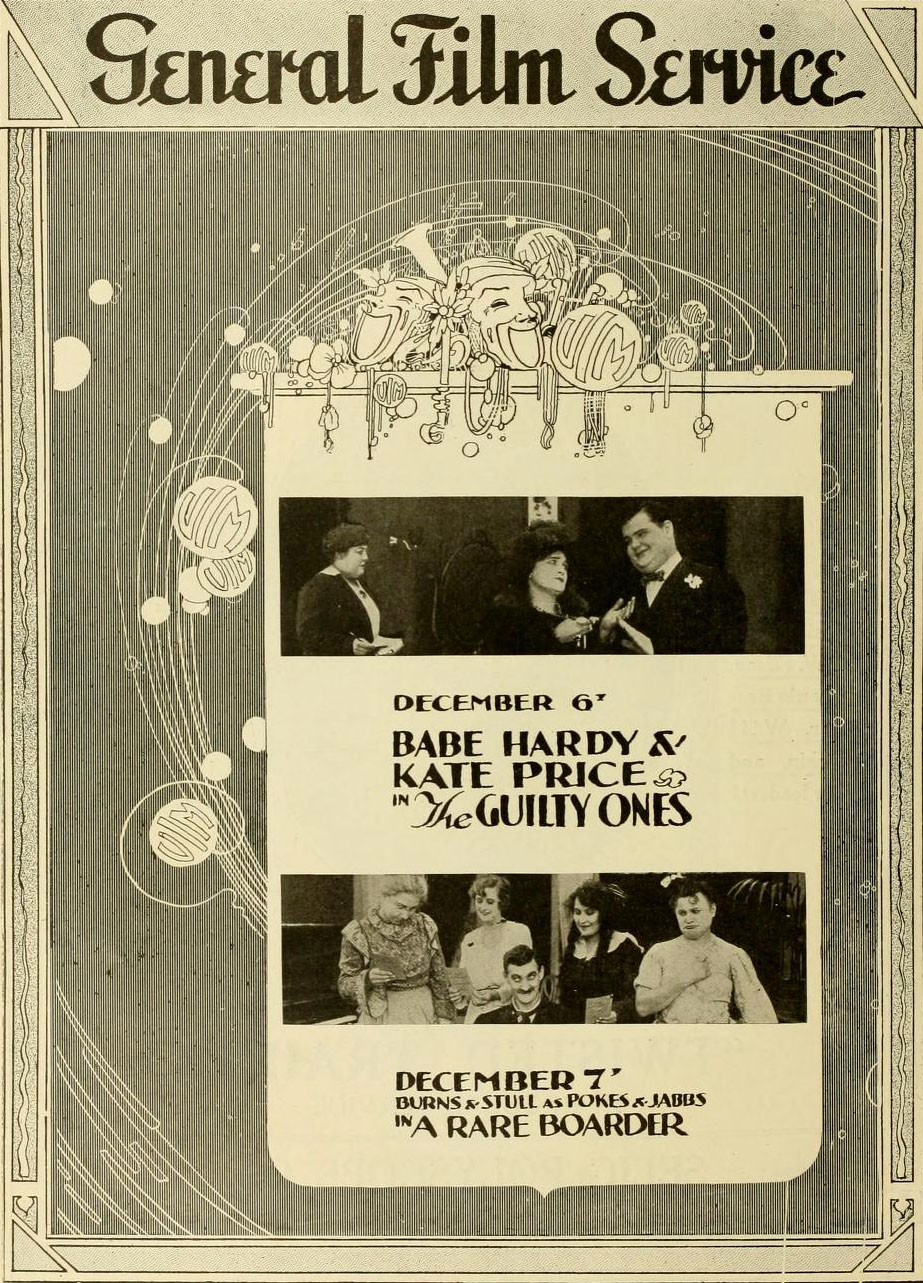
The Guilty Ones, one of ten shorts directed or co-directed by 'Babe Hardy'

Between 1916 and 1917, Hardy experienced a brief directorial career. He is credited for directing or co-directing ten shorts, all played by him.

In 1917, Hardy moved to Los Angeles, working freelance for several Hollywood studios. He made more than 40 films for Vitagraph between 1918 and 1923, mostly playing the "heavy" for Larry Semon. In 1919, he separated from his wife, ending with a provisional divorce in November 1920 that was finalized on November 17, 1921. On November 24, 1921, he married actress Myrtle Reeves. This marriage was also unhappy, and Reeves was said to have become an alcoholic.

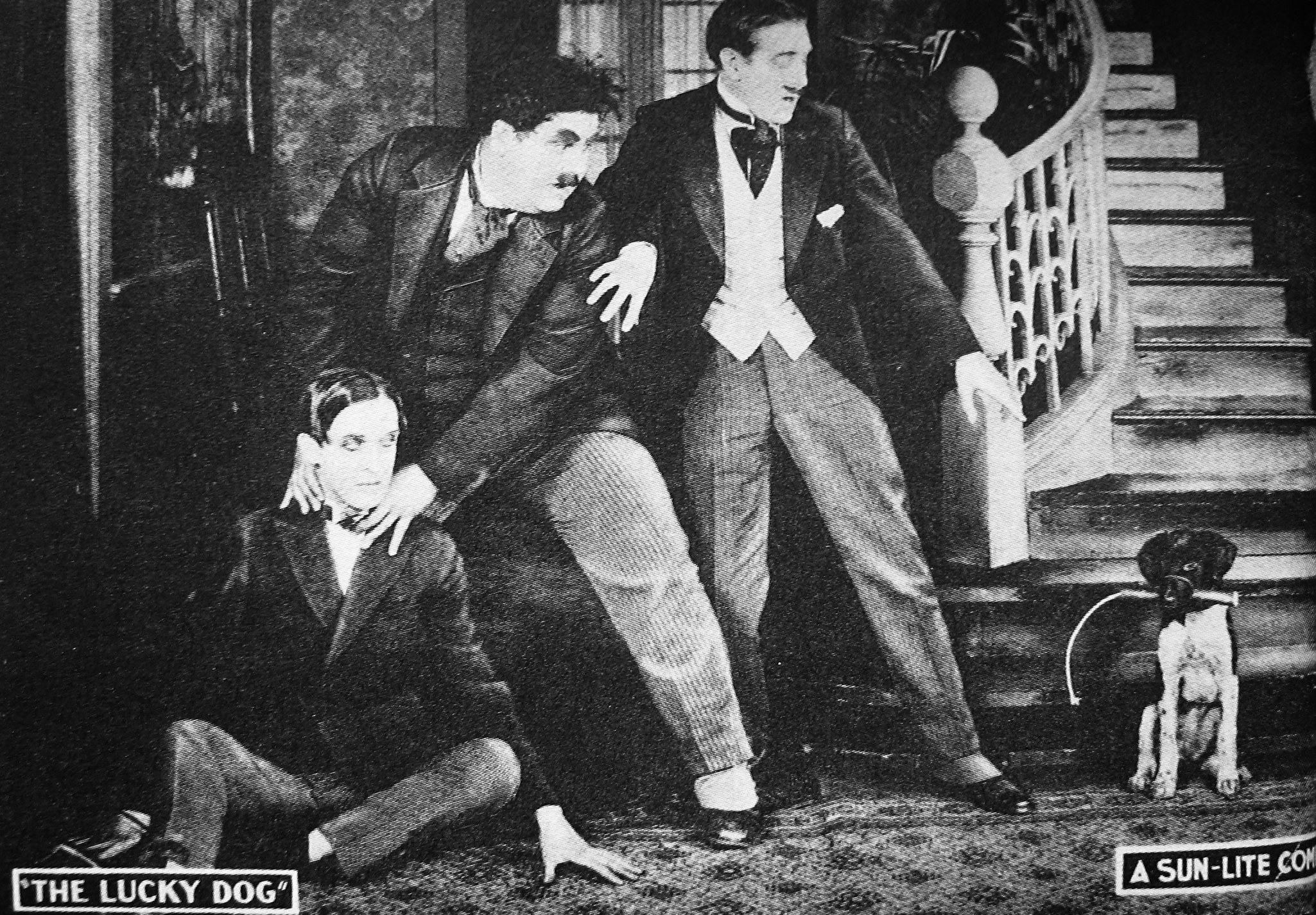
With Stan Laurel in The Lucky Dog (1921), six years before they became a team

In 1921, he appeared in the movie The Lucky Dog, produced by Broncho Billy Anderson and starring Stan Laurel. Hardy played the part of a robber trying to hold up Stan's character. They did not work together again for several years.

In 1924, Hardy began working at Hal Roach Studios with the Our Gang films and Charley Chase. In 1925, his old boss Larry Semon hired him to play the Tin Man in Semon's feature-film adaptation of The Wizard of Oz. That same year another former colleague, Billy West, recruited Hardy to appear opposite mild-mannered comic Bobby Ray in four slapstick comedies. These shorts, with Hardy and Ray as fat-and-skinny characters in derbies, were prototypes for the later Laurel and Hardy comedies. As Hardy recalled in 1954, "Bobby was always the fall guy; I was the wise guy just as I am in Laurel and Hardy, only in Laurel and Hardy, I always am the fall guy. I think of [those pictures] once in a while as being the start of the Laurel and Hardy idea as far as I was concerned."

He continued to work in the Hal Roach comedies, like Yes, Yes, Nanette!, starring Jimmy Finlayson and directed by Stan Laurel. (In later years, Finlayson frequently was a supporting actor in the Laurel and Hardy film series.) He also continued playing supporting roles in films featuring Clyde Cook, including Wandering Papas (1925, directed by Laurel).

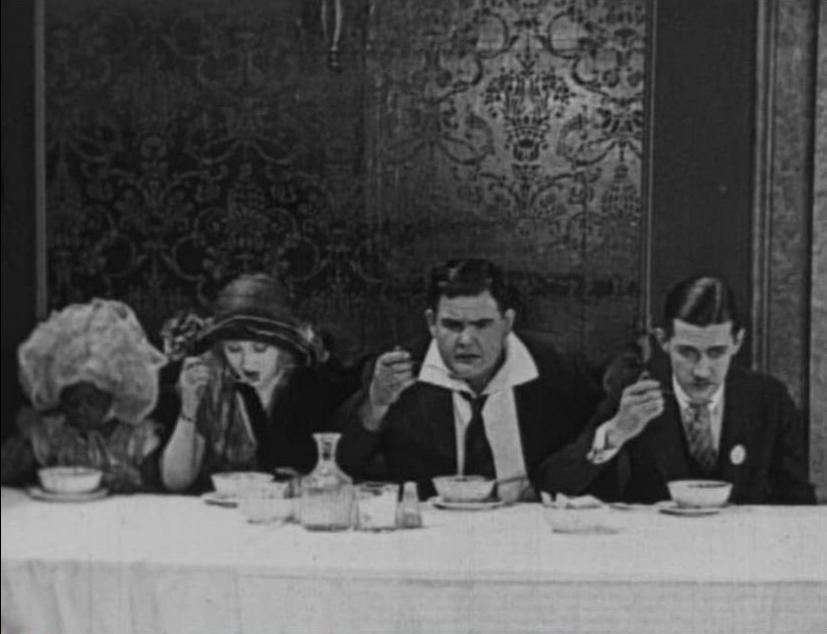
Hardy played a supporting role in Isn't Life Terrible? (1925) with Charley Chase and Katherine Grant.

In 1926, Hardy was to appear in Get 'Em Young, but he was unexpectedly hospitalized after being burned by a hot leg of lamb. Laurel had been working as a gag man and a director at Roach Studios, so he was recruited to fill in. Laurel continued to act and appeared in 45 Minutes from Hollywood with Hardy, although they did not share any scenes together.

=== With Stan Laurel ===
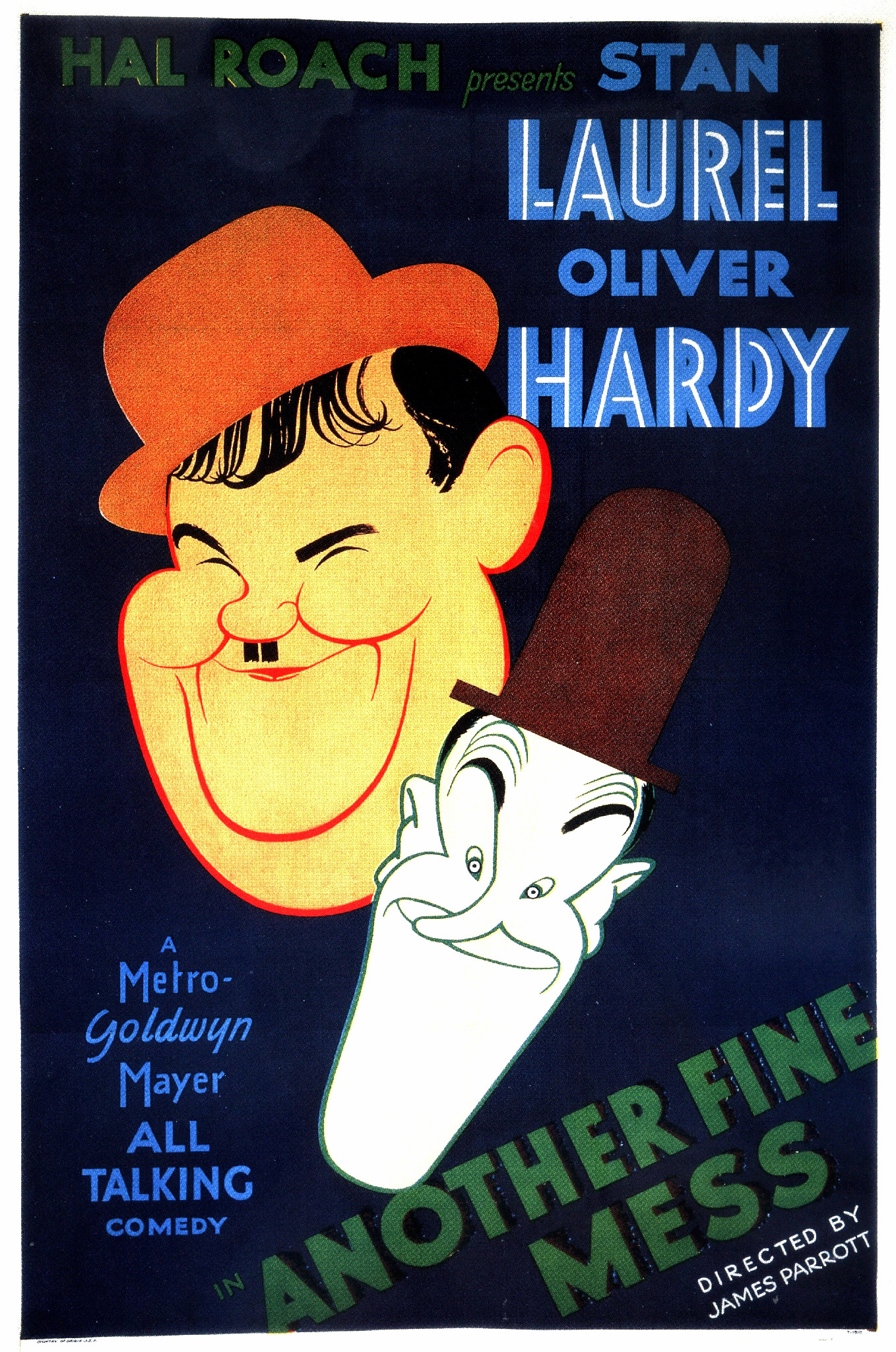
Movie poster for Another Fine Mess (1930)

In 1927, Laurel and Hardy began sharing screen time together in Slipping Wives, Duck Soup (no relation to the 1933 Marx Brothers' film), and With Love and Hisses. Roach Studios' supervising director Leo McCarey recognized the audience reaction to the two and began teaming them together, which led to the start of a Laurel and Hardy series later that year.

They began producing a huge body of short comedies, including The Battle of the Century (1927) (with one of the greatest pie fights ever filmed), Should Married Men Go Home? (1928), Two Tars (1928), Unaccustomed As We Are (1929, marking their transition to talking pictures) Berth Marks (1929), Blotto (1930), Brats (1930), Another Fine Mess (1930), and Be Big! (1931). In 1929, they appeared in their first feature, in one of the revue sequences of Hollywood Revue of 1929, and the following year they appeared as the comic relief in a lavish Technicolor musical feature entitled The Rogue Song. This film marked their first appearance in color, yet only a few fragments of this film survive. In 1931, they starred in their first full-length movie Pardon Us, and they continued to make features and shorts until 1935. The 1932 film The Music Box won an Academy Award for best short film, their only effort to receive such an award.

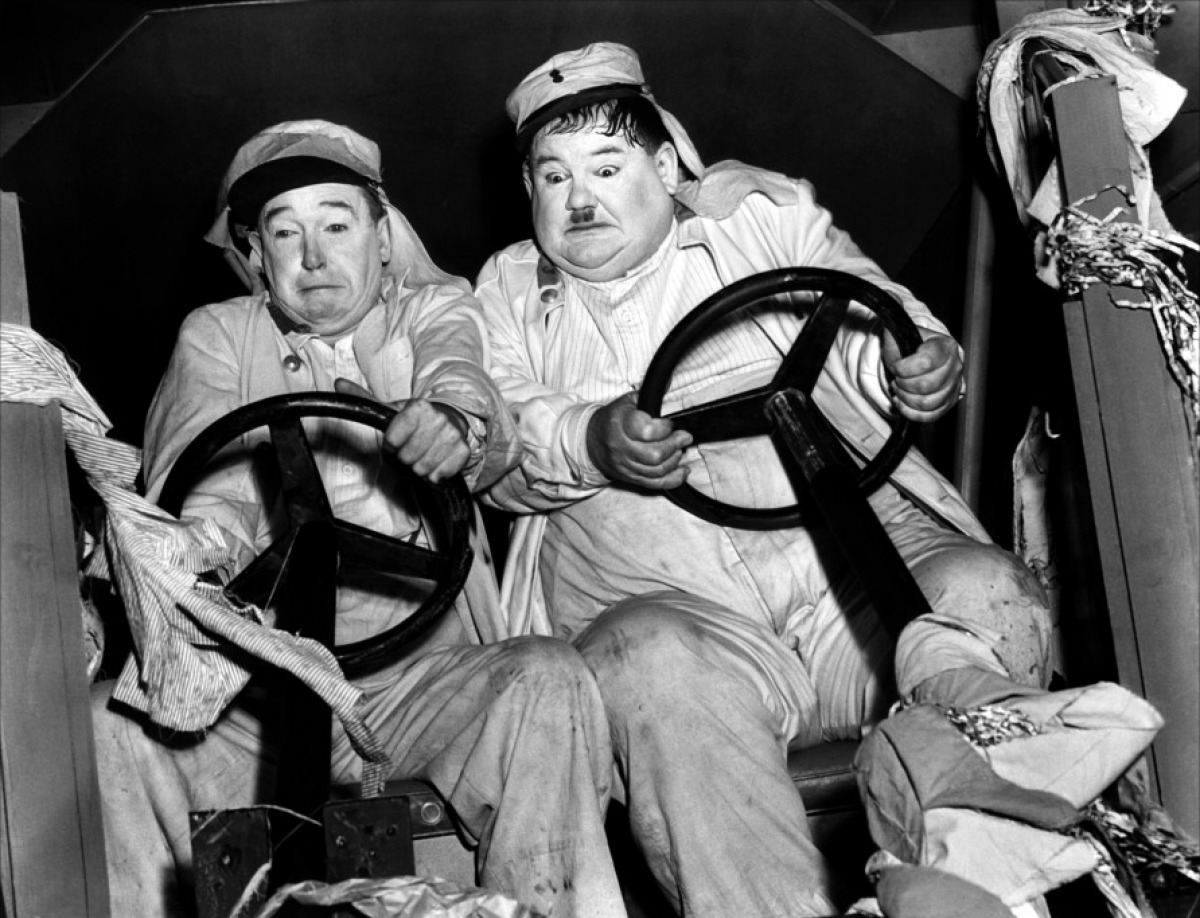
Laurel and Hardy in The Flying Deuces (1939)

In 1937, Hardy and Myrtle Reeves divorced. He made Zenobia with Harry Langdon in 1939 while waiting for a contractual issue to be resolved between Laurel and Hal Roach. Eventually, however, new contracts were agreed upon and the team was lent to producer Boris Morros at General Service Studios to make The Flying Deuces (1939). While on the lot, Hardy fell in love with Virginia Lucille Jones, a script girl whom he married the next year. They enjoyed a happy marriage for the rest of his life.

In 1939, Laurel and Hardy made A Chump at Oxford and Saps at Sea before leaving the Roach Studios. They began performing for the USO, supporting the Allied troops during World War II.

In 1941, Laurel and Hardy were signed by 20th Century-Fox (as well as Metro-Goldwyn-Mayer in 1942). These studios produced films on a larger scale, and initially the comedians were hired only as actors in the B-picture division, forced to leave the writing and editing decisions to the production teams. The films proved very successful, and gradually both Laurel and Hardy were allowed more creative input. Laurel and Hardy completed eight features during the war years, with no loss of popularity. M-G-M's two-picture pact expired in August 1944, and Fox's series of six Laurel & Hardy pictures ended when the studio discontinued B-picture production in December 1944.

In 1947, Laurel and Hardy went on a six-week tour of the United Kingdom. They were initially unsure of how they would be received, but they were mobbed wherever they went. The tour was lengthened to include engagements in Scandinavia, Belgium, France, and a Royal Command Performance for King George VI and Queen Elizabeth. Biographer John McCabe writes that they continued to make live appearances in the United Kingdom and France until 1954, often using new sketches and material that Laurel had written for them.

During post-war tours of the United Kingdom, Hardy and Stan Laurel made visits outside major cities, including the village of Barkston, Lincolnshire, where Laurel's sister operated a public house. Contemporary accounts describe large public turnouts during their visits.

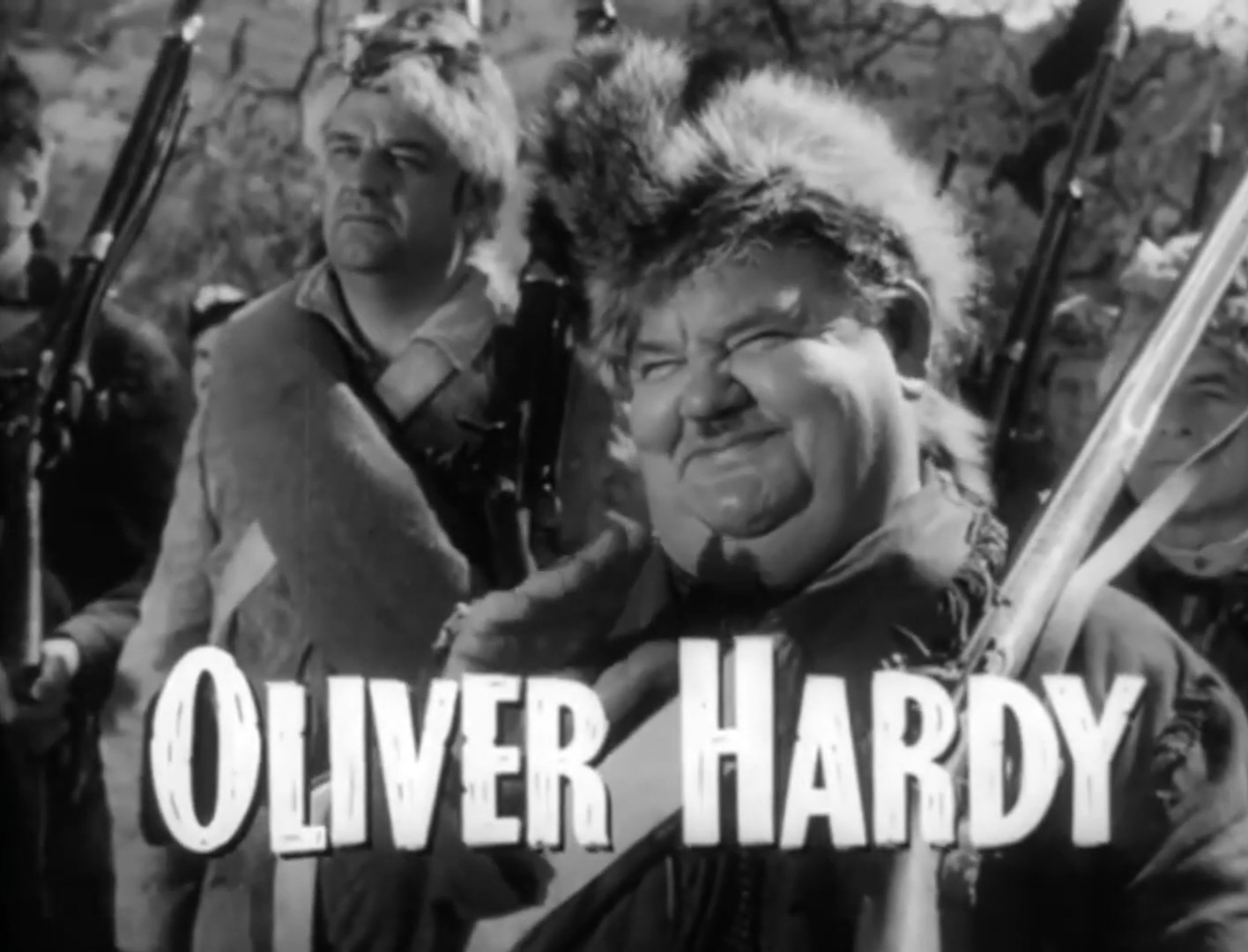
The Fighting Kentuckian (1949)

In 1949, Hardy's friend John Wayne asked him to play a supporting role in The Fighting Kentuckian. Hardy had previously worked with Wayne and John Ford in a charity production of the play What Price Glory? while Laurel began treatment for his diabetes a few years previously. He was initially hesitant, but he accepted the role at Laurel's insistence. Frank Capra invited him to play a cameo role in Riding High with Bing Crosby in 1950.

During 1950–1951, Laurel and Hardy made their final film Atoll K (also known as Utopia). It was a simple concept; Laurel inherits an island, and the boys set out to sea where they encounter a storm and discover a brand new island, rich in uranium, making them powerful and wealthy. However, the film was produced by a consortium of European interests, with an international cast and crew that could not speak to each other. In addition, Laurel had to rewrite the script to make it fit the comedy team's style, and both suffered serious physical illness during the filming.

Laurel and Hardy made two live television appearances: in 1953 on a live broadcast of the BBC show Face the Music, and in December 1954 on NBC's This Is Your Life. They also appeared in a filmed insert for the BBC show This Is Music Hall in 1955, their final appearance together. The pair contracted with Hal Roach Jr. to produce a series of TV shows based on the Mother Goose fables in 1955. According to biographer John McCabe, they were to be filmed in color for NBC, but the series was postponed when Laurel had a stroke and required a lengthy convalescence. Later that year while Laurel was recovering, Hardy had a heart attack and stroke from which he never recovered.

== Illness and death ==
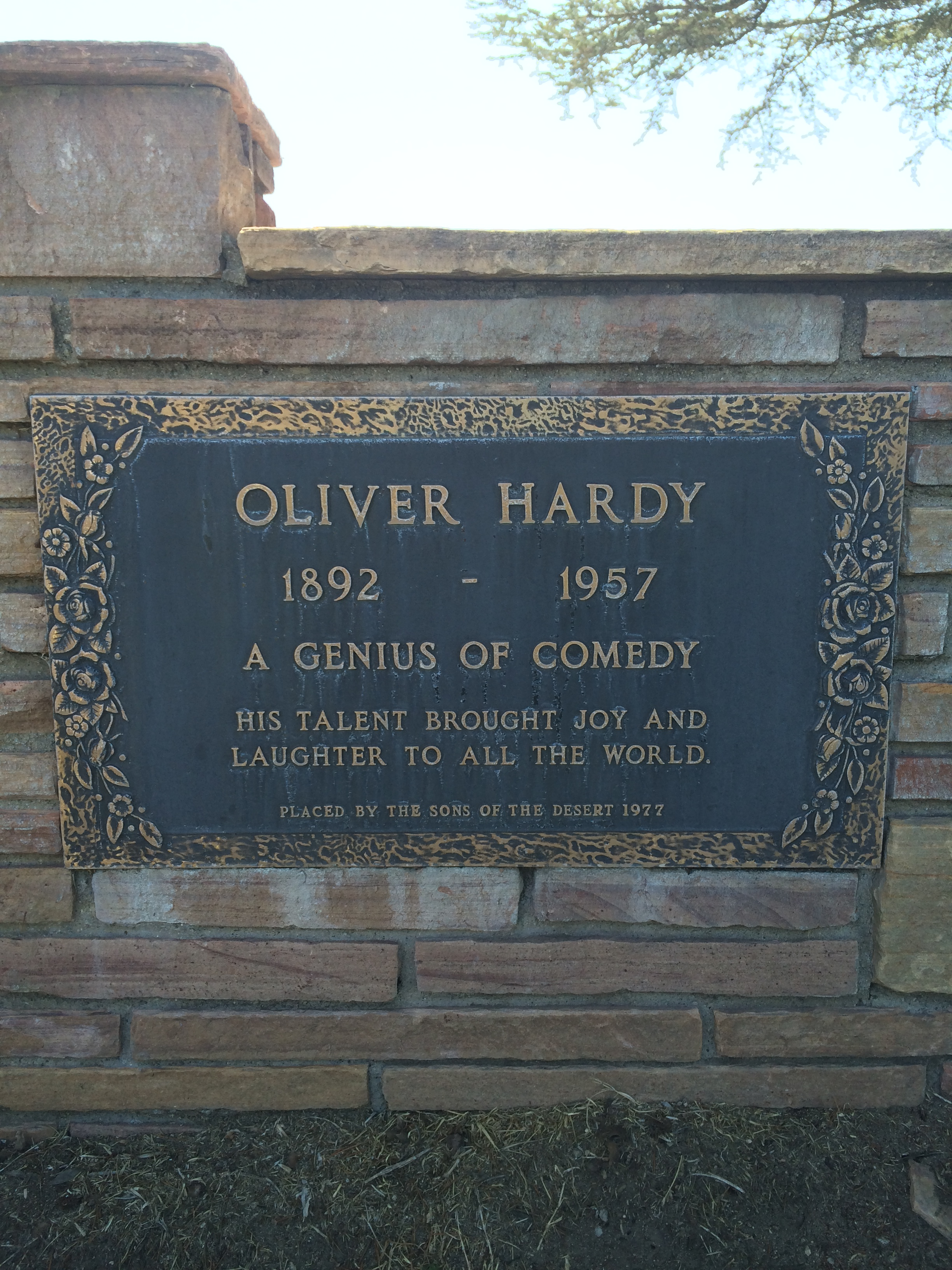
Marker of Oliver Hardy's Grave at Valhalla Memorial Park

Hardy had a mild heart attack in May 1954 and he began looking after his health for the first time in his life. He lost more than 150 pounds (68 kg) within a few months which completely changed his appearance. Letters written by Laurel refer to Hardy having terminal cancer and it was speculated that this was the reason for Hardy's rapid weight loss. Both men were smokers; Hal Roach said that they were a couple of "freight train smoke stacks".

Hardy had a major stroke on September 14, 1956, that left him confined to bed and unable to speak for several months. He remained at home in the care of his wife Lucille. Following two more strokes in early August 1957, he slipped into a coma and died from cerebral thrombosis on August 7, 1957, at age 65. (Note: Quote: "Oliver Hardy, the fat, always frustrated partner of the famous movie comedy team of Laurel and Hardy, died early today at the North Hollywood home of his mother-in-law, Mrs. Monnie L. Jones. Mr. Hardy, who was 65 years old, suffered a paralytic stroke last Sept. 12.") After he was cremated, his ashes were interred in the Masonic Garden of Valhalla Memorial Park Cemetery in North Hollywood. Laurel was inconsolable at the loss of his "dear pal and partner"; his doctor advised Laurel against attending the funeral, due to his own poor health, and Laurel agreed stating that "Babe would understand".

== Legacy ==
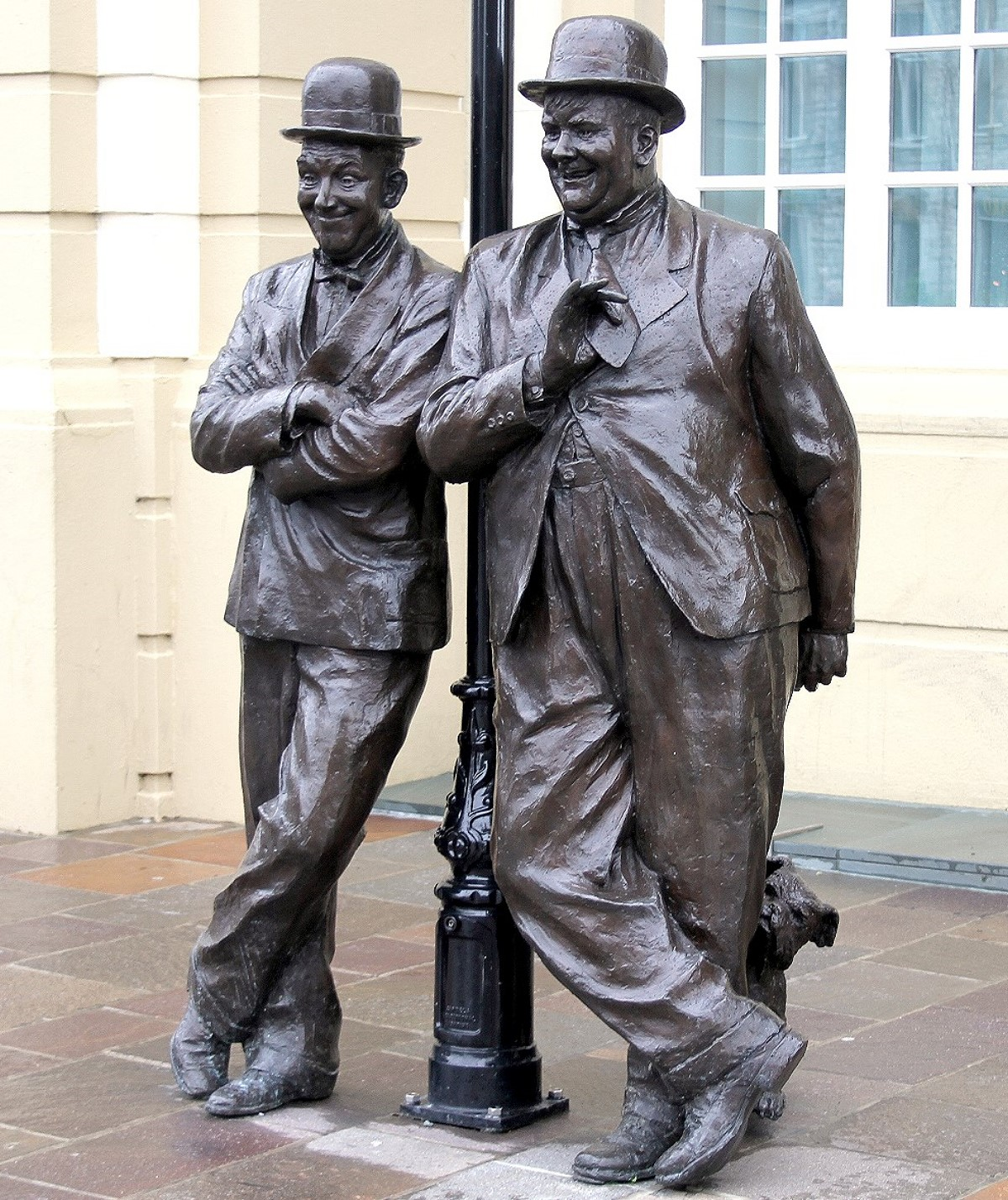
Statue of Stan Laurel and Oliver Hardy outside the Coronation Hall Theatre, Ulverston, Cumbria, England

- Hardy's star on the Hollywood Walk of Fame is located at 1500 Vine Street, Hollywood, California.
- Laurel and Hardy were inducted into the Grand Order of Water Rats.
- There is a small Laurel and Hardy Museum in Hardy's hometown of Harlem, Georgia, which opened on July 15, 2002. The town holds an annual Oliver Hardy Festival.
- The biographical film Stan & Ollie (2018) starred Steve Coogan as Laurel and John C. Reilly as Hardy.
