= It Pays to Advertise =

It Pays to Advertise may refer to:

- It Pays to Advertise (play), a 1914 farce by Roi Cooper Megrue and Walter Hackett
- It Pays to Advertise (1919 film), an American silent drama film, based on the play
- It Pays to Advertise (1931 film), an American pre-Code comedy film, based on the play
- It Pays to Advertise (1936 film), a Swedish comedy film directed by Anders Henrikson, based on the play
- It Pays to Advertise (Are You Being Served?), an episode of the BBC's British sitcom directed by Bob Spiers.
