= Montague Glass =

American dramatist (1877–1934)

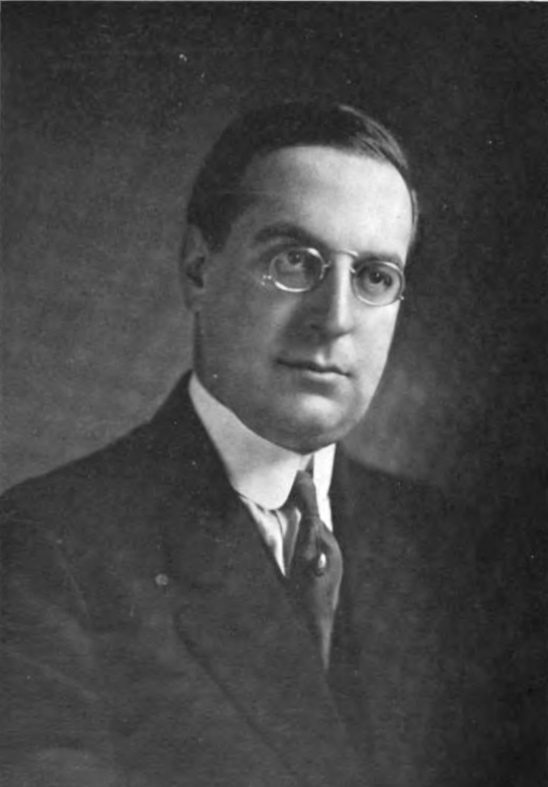

Montague Marsden Glass (July 23, 1877 – February 3, 1934) was a British-American Jewish lawyer and writer of short stories, plays and film scripts. His greatest success came with the creation of his fictional duo Abe Potash and Morris ("Mawrus") Perlmutter, who appeared in three books, a play, and several films.

== Life ==
Glass was born in Manchester, England, but spent his childhood in Baguley, in Cheshire. Glass's father worked in the linen and cotton trade. The Glass family moved to New York in 1890, in pursuit of Glass's father's business interests. Glass married Mary Caroline Patterson in 1908. He attended The College of the City of New York, and New York University Law School. After qualifying for the bar, Glass practiced law for several years while writing semi-professionally on the side. In 1909, Glass abandoned the practice of law to write full-time. Glass's transition from law to professional writing coincided with the emergence of the a pair of characters that would prove to be his most enduringly popular creations: Abe Potash and Mawrus Perlmutter. He died on February 3, 1934, at his home in Westport, Connecticut and was buried in Woodlawn Cemetery. He was survived by his widow, Mary Caroline Glass, and a daughter, Elizabeth Glass.

== Potash & Perlmutter ==
Potash and Perlmutter made their debut in the short stories published serially in the New York Evening Post. These were then published in a collection Potash and Perlmutter: Their Copartnership Ventures and Adventures, in 1909. In the first story, Potash and Perlmutter meet and become partners in the "cloak and suit" business. Subsequent stories seek humor in the pair's business dealings with buyers, suppliers and employees.

Glass, trained as a lawyer, derived the plots of many of the stories from his own experience of the legal problems typical of traders in goods: breached contracts, deliveries of non-conforming goods, problems with trade credit, etc. "For ten years Mr. Glass was present almost daily at bankruptcy meetings, closing of titles to real estate, and conferences with reference to the entrance into or dissolution of co-partnerships." These experiences formed the basis of his stories.

The characters of Potash and Perlmutter were both Jewish, like Glass himself. The characters' Jewishness is highlighted by Glass's use of dialect in rendering their dialogue. One contemporary critic wrote: "His method is photographic and phonographic; that is, we get the life just as it stirs daily in the cloak and suit section of New York, and we get it through its own language." In rendering the characters' dialect in print, Glass primarily relied on word choice and word order, seldom misspelling words for effect. Thus, a critic in 1917 distinguished Glass's style from "dialect stories ... in which the "Hoot mon" and "Ah'. gwuine, Suh" are sprinkled as liberally as caraway seeds in rye bread."

Following the success of the first Potash and Perlmutter collection in 1909, Glass wrote four more books starring the characters: Abe and Mawruss: Being Further Adventures of Potash and Perlmutter (1911), Worrying Won't Win (1918), Potash and Perlmutter Settle Things (1919) and Y'Understand (1925). The 1927 collection Lucky Numbers also includes one Potash and Perlmutter story.

The use of dialect was carried over into the stage adaptations. Willa Cather wrote of the 1913 play Potash and Perlmutter, "[T]here is not an American in the piece and the only character who speaks conventional English is a Russian refugee." In a later essay, Cather remarked that the stage dialect was accurate enough to satisfy a heavily Jewish audience that was fully familiar with the types being portrayed.

The characters seem to have been enjoyed by Jewish audiences. Cather wrote, "During the long run of 'Potash and Perlmutter' here, we learned as much about the garment trade in New York from the very characteristic audiences as from the play. Far from dissenting or disapproving, the great Jewish population of the city packed Cohen's Theater night after night, roared at and applauded the play, greedily appropriated it, fairly ate it up." She added: "Mr. Montague Glass's characters were not counterfeits."

=== Critical reception ===
Glass's print and stage presentations of the characters Potash and Perlmutter were positively received by contemporary critics. The literary journal The Bookman named the characters' debut collection, Potash & Perlmutter: Their Copartnership Ventures and Adventures, a book of the month in August 1910. In a two-page review, its critic James Oppenheim declared: "Mr. Glass is an artist. ... [His characters] live as really as Pickwick, Becky Sharp, and Falstaff." The same review speculated and hoped that Mr. Glass might employ his aptitude for creating memorable characters in future works to match the best works of Charles Dickens: "[I]t is to be hoped that this book is Mr. Glass's Pickwick Papers and that he is going on to write a David Copperfield."

Willa Cather called Glass's 1914 play Potash and Perlmutter the "most successful - and the best -- play now running in New York." She acknowledged, however, the play was "rather loosely made" and the plot negligible, stating that it was "built upon the theory that people are more interested in character types and in live lines than in situations." Writing of both the early short stories and plays featuring the characters, author Arthur Bartlett Maurice wrote: "[T]here is not more vital trail in recent fiction dealing with the city [of New York] than that of Mr. Montague Glass"

In modern times, Glass and his work have been largely forgotten. In part, changing attitudes about the portrayal of race and ethnicity have led to the near-total disappearance of dialect writing such as that featured in the Potash & Perlmutter stories. In an extensive biographical and critical introduction to a modern reprint of selected Potash & Perlmutter stories, editor S.T. Joshi cites examples of modern criticism of Glass's use of dialect, but responds: "There is no reason to doubt Glass's assertion, in The Truth About Potash and Perlmutter, that the speech he places in the mouths of all his characters (not just his two protagonists) is the speech he actually heard as a lawyer in dealing with Jewish members of the garment and other industries in New York. Certainly, the language he uses is not nearly as much a caricature as, say, that of Leo Rosten's Hyman Kaplan. ...The use of Germano-Yiddish expressions adds richness and vibrancy to the characters."

=== Stage, film and radio adaptations ===
Glass wrote a series of stage comedies featuring Potash and Perlmutter, co-writing the majority of them with Jules Eckert Goodman. These stage works included Potash and Perlmutter (1913) (with Charles Klein); Abe and Mawruss (1915) (with Roi Cooper Megrue); Business Before Pleasure (1917) (with Jules Eckert Goodman); His Honor: Abe Potash (1919) (with Jules Eckert Goodman); Partners Again (1922) (with Jules Eckert Goodman); Potash and Perlmutter, Detectives (1926) (with Jules Eckert Goodman). The play Keeping Expenses Down was based on a story about Potash and Perlmutter, although the names of the characters were changed for the stage production. Several film adaptations of the stories were made, including Potash and Perlmutter (1923), In Hollywood with Potash and Perlmutter (1924), and Partners Again (1926). In most of these adaptations, the roles of Abe Potash and Mawruss Perlmutter were played respectively by Barney Bernard and Alexander Carr, both of whom were lauded for their performances by Willa Cather. Although several of his other plays received favorable notices, except for Potash and Perlmutter, they had short runs.

In 1915, a monologue written by Glass, “Cohen Telephones the Health Department”, was recorded by Columbia for their popular “Cohen on the Telephone” series.

== Other works ==
Glass also wrote many short stories and essays that were unrelated to the characters of Potash & Perlmutter, publishing several collections largely composed of such work: Y'Understand (1925), Lucky Numbers (1927), and You Can't Learn 'Em Nothin' (1930). In addition, he was author or co-author of several plays that did not feature Potash and Perlmutter, including Object - Matrimony (1916) (with Jules Eckert Goodman); Why Worry? (musical comedy) (1918) (book by Glass, with Jules Eckert Goodman, lyrics by Blanche Merrill, music by Leo Edwards); and Keeping Expenses Down (1932) (with Dan Jarett).

== Bibliography ==
- Potash & Perlmutter: Their Copartnership Ventures and Adventures (1909)
- Abe and Mawruss: Being Further Adventures of Potash and Perlmutter (1911)
- Object: Matrimony (1912)
- Elkan Lubliner, American (1912)
- The Competitive Nephew (1915)
- Worrying Won't Win (1918)
- Potash and Perlmutter Settle Things, aka Potash and Perlmutter at the Peace Conference (1919)
- Y'Understand (1925)
- Lucky Numbers (1927)
- You Can't Learn 'Em Nothin' (1930)
