= Potash and Perlmutter (play) =

Play

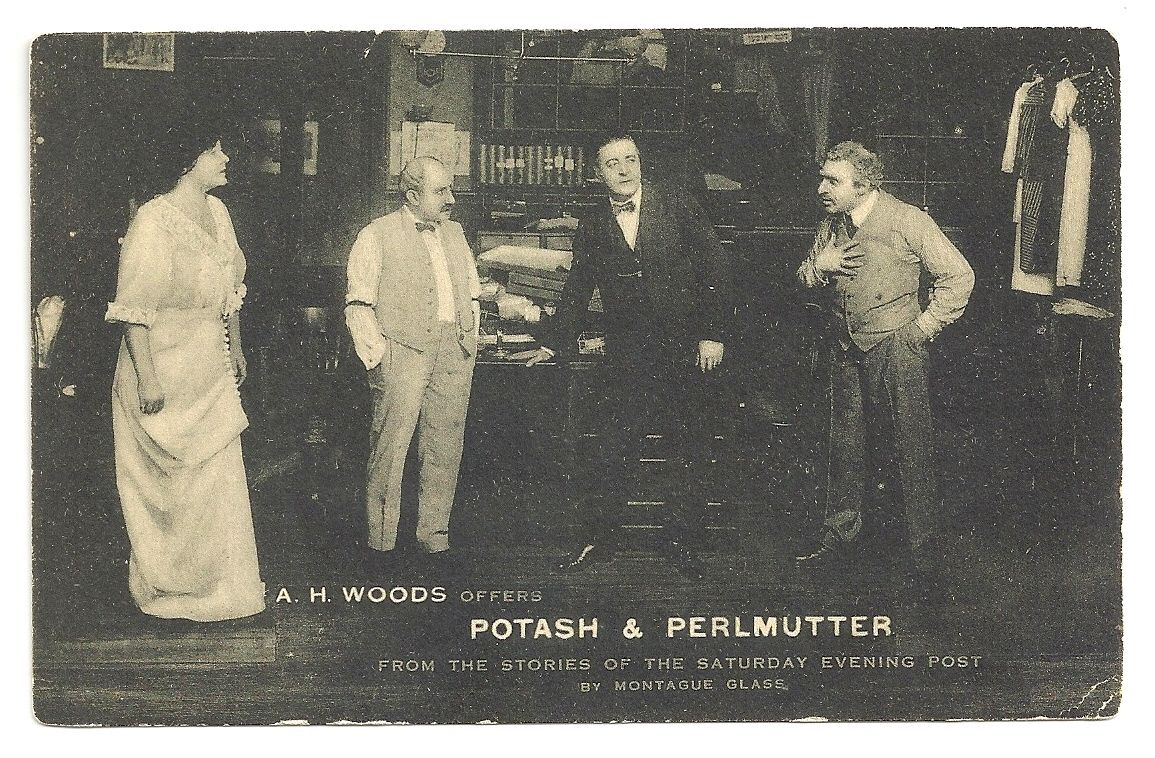
- Postcard advertising the Broadway production
- Written by: Montague Glass and Charles Klein
- Original language: English
- Genre: Comedy
- Setting: New York City

Premiere
- Date premiered: August 16, 1913
- Place premiered: George M. Cohan's Theatre

Potash and Perlmutter is a three-act play written by Montague Glass and Charles Klein, based on earlier short stories written by Glass. Producer Albert H. Woods staged it on Broadway, where it opened at the George M. Cohan Theatre on August 16, 1913. The play is a comedy featuring the characters Abe Potash and Mawruss Perlmutter, who are business partners in the garment industry.

The play was a hit and ran for 441 performances on Broadway. A production in London's West End opened on April 14, 1914, at the Queen's Theatre starring Augustus Yorke and Robert Leonard. By the fall of 1914, Woods had eight road companies presenting the show on tour.

According to George S. Kaufman, the success of the play was due to the largely-uncredited staging by Hugh Ford. Kaufman, then a drama critic for the New-York Tribune said of Ford: "He did more than stage it; he built it. So valuable were his services, in fact, that he is said to have been paid a royalty upon the play".

The play was adapted as a 1923 movie, also called Potash and Perlmutter. Woods produced several theatrical sequels, including Abe and Mawruss (1915), Business Before Pleasure (1917), His Honor: Abe Potash (1919), Partners Again (1922), and Potash and Perlmutter, Detectives (1926), all written by Glass with various co-authors.

== Cast and characters ==
The characters and opening night cast from the Broadway production are listed below:

Cast of the Broadway production
Character	Broadway cast
Abe Potash	Barney Bernard
Mawruss Perlmutter	Alexander Carr
Marks Pasinsky	Lee Kohlmar
Henry D. Feldman	Joseph Kilgour
Boris Andrieff	Albert Parker
Mozart Rabiner	Leo Donnelly
Henry Steuerman	Stanley Jessup
Senator Sullivan	Edward Gillespie
Book Agent	Arthur J. Pickens
Sidney	Russell Pincus
Expressman	Dore Rogers
U.S. Deputy Marshal	James Cherry
U.S. Deputy Marshal	Melville Hecht
Felix Schoen	Edward Mortimer
Ruth Snyder	Louise Dresser
Mrs. Potash	Elita Proctor Otis
Miss Cohen	Gertrude Millington
Irma Potash	Marguerite Anderson
Miss Levine	Grace Fielding
Miss O'Brien	Doris Easton
Miss Potchley	Dorothy Landers
Miss Nelson	Marie Baker
