= Charlotte Ives =

American actress (1886–1976)

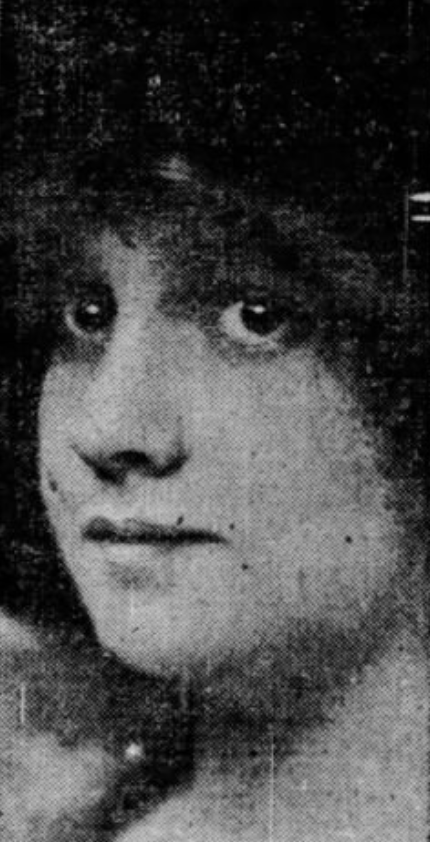
- Charlotte Ives, from a 1917 newspaper
- Born: Charlotte Danziger; November 27, 1886; Boston, Massachusetts, US
- Died: September 1976 (89 years old); Cap d'Antibes, France
- Other names: Charlotte Boissevain (married name, after 1921)
- Occupation: Actress
- Relatives: Boissevain family, Edna St. Vincent Millay (sister-in-law)

Charlotte Ives Boissevain (November 27, 1886 – September 1976), born Charlotte Danziger, was an American actress who appeared on Broadway and in silent films.

== Early life ==
Charlotte "Lottie" Danziger was born in Boston, Massachusetts, the daughter of Charles Danziger and Leah Cohen Danziger. Her mother was born in Hungary; she died in 1904.

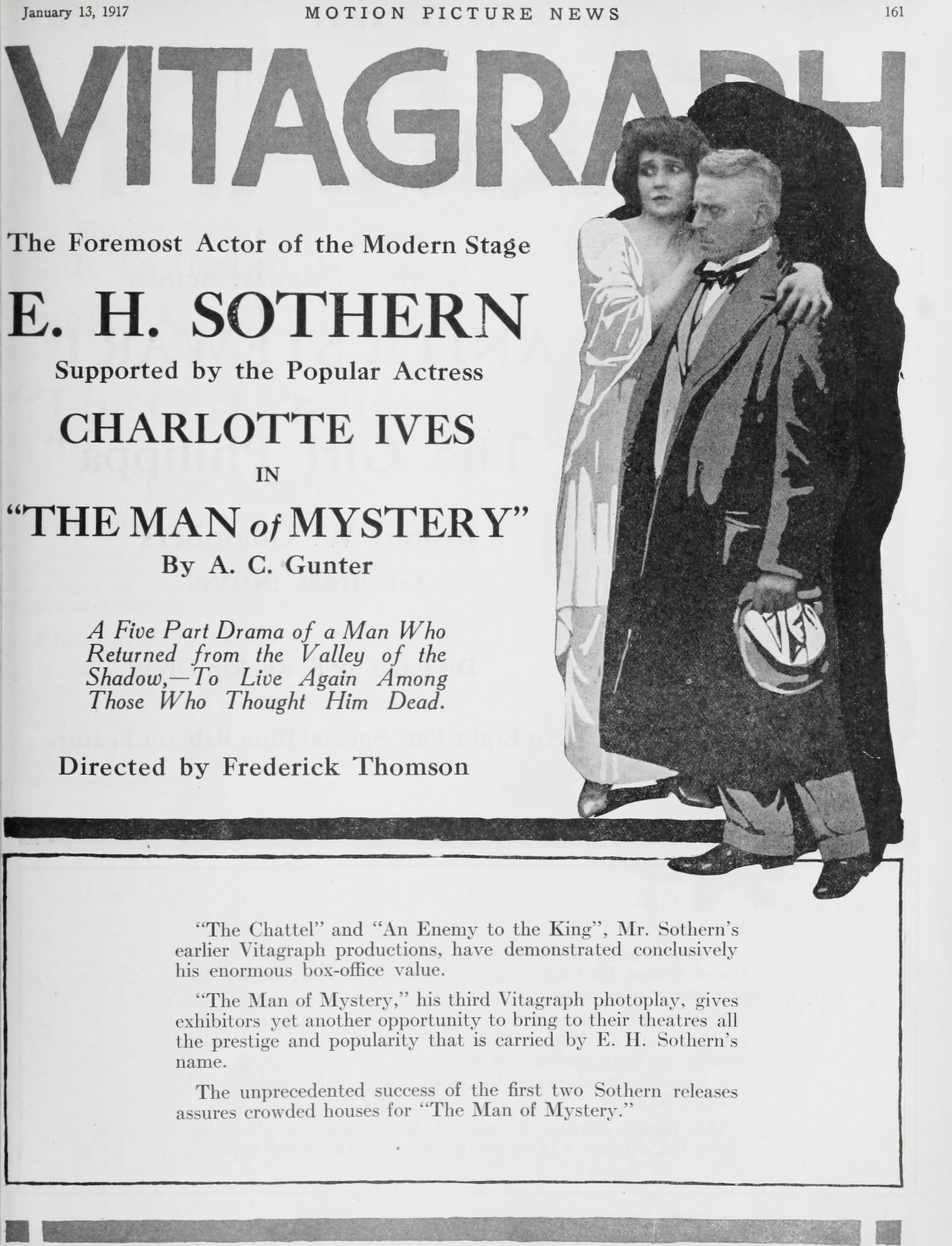
The Man of Mystery (1917), print advertisement, including Charlotte Ives credit and image

== Career ==
Danziger acted using her original name in 1909, as the protegee of Eleanor Robson; but she soon began to use the name "Charlotte Ives", and this was the name she used personally and professionally thereafter. Film credits for Ives included roles in several silent pictures: Clothes (1914), The Dictator (1915), A Prince in a Pawnshop (1916), The Man of Mystery (1917), The Warfare of the Flesh (1917), Prince Cosimo (1919), and The Splendid Romance (1919). On stage, she appeared in Broadway and touring productions including The Upstart (1910), The Turning Point (1910), As a Man Thinks (1911), Passers-by (1912), Liberty Hall (1913), A Woman Killed with Kindness (1914), A Scrap of Paper (1914), The High Cost of Loving (1914), The Brat (1917), What's Your Husband Doing? (1917), The Man Who Stayed Home (1918), and She Had to Know (1925).

== Personal life ==
Ives was engaged to marry opera singer Antonio Scotti in 1912, and married Dutch-born importer Jan M. Boissevain in 1921. Her brother-in-law, Eugen Boissevain, was married first to suffragist Inez Milholland, and later to poet Edna St. Vincent Millay. She became a Dutch citizen upon marriage, but petitioned for the restoration of her US citizenship in 1940, under the provisions of the Cable Act of 1922. Charlotte Ives Boissevain lived in Cap d'Antibes in her later years, and was close to fellow American actress Maxine Elliott there. She had two sisters, Helen I. Maltby and Augusta Hartley. Her husband died in 1964, and she died in 1976, aged 90 years, in France.
