= The Splendid Romance =

- Directed by: Edward José
- Screenplay by: Margaret Turnbull
- Starring: Enrico Caruso; Ormi Hawley; Crauford Kent; Charlotte Ives
- Production companies: Famous Players–Lasky Corporation; Artcraft Pictures Corporation
- Distributed by: Paramount Pictures
- Release date: June 1, 1919
- Running time: 50 minutes
- Country: United States
- Language: Silent (English intertitles)

The Splendid Romance is a 1919 American silent drama film directed by Edward José, written by Margaret Turnbull, and starring Enrico Caruso, Ormi Hawley, Crauford Kent, and Charlotte Ives. It was released on June 1, 1919, by Paramount Pictures. After the abysmal showing of Caruso's film debut in My Cousin, producers decided to not show The Splendid Romance in the United States. However, both films were well received in England.

== Cast ==
- Enrico Caruso as Prince Cosimo
- Ormi Hawley as American Music Student
- Crauford Kent
- Charlotte Ives

== Preservation status ==
The Splendid Romance is presumed to be a lost film, although a copy may exist in a private collection.
