= It Pays to Advertise (1936 film) =

1936 film

- Directed by: Anders Henrikson
- Written by: Torsten Lundqvist; Börje Larsson
- Based on: It Pays to Advertise by Roi Cooper Megrue and Walter Hackett
- Produced by: Stellan Claësson
- Starring: Thor Modéen; Håkan Westergren; Birgit Tengroth
- Cinematography: Martin Bodin
- Edited by: Rolf Husberg
- Music by: Eric Bengtson
- Production company: Fribergs Filmbyrå
- Distributed by: Fribergs Filmbyrå
- Release date: 19 August 1936
- Running time: 76 minutes
- Country: Sweden
- Language: Swedish

It Pays to Advertise or simply Advertise! (Swedish: Annonsera!) is a 1936 Swedish comedy film directed by Anders Henrikson and starring Thor Modéen, Håkan Westergren and Birgit Tengroth. The film was shot at the Råsunda Studios in Stockholm and its sets were designed by the art director Arne Åkermark. It is based on the 1914 Broadway play It Pays to Advertise by Roi Cooper Megrue and Walter Hackett, previously adapted into the 1931 American film of same title starring Carole Lombard.

== Synopsis ==
The son of a soap tycoon is so reckless with money and living a life of luxury that his father cuts him off financially. With a small amount of money, encouraged by his father's secretary, the son establishes his own competing soap-manufacturing business which relies heavily on a strong advertising campaign.

== Cast ==
- Thor Modéen as Soap Director Miller
- Håkan Westergren as Henry Miller
- Åke Söderblom as Ambrosius Bergman
- Birgit Tengroth as Mary Lind, Secretary
- Valdemar Dalquist as Oskar Fagerberg
- Anders Henrikson as Adolf Fagerberg
- Eric Abrahamsson as Karlsson
- Sonja Claesson as Berta
- Hartwig Fock as Olsson
- Sven-Eric Gamble as Office Boy
- Eric Gustafson as Director Jönsson
- Jullan Jonsson as Hilma, Cook
- Ingrid Luterkort as Fagerberg's Telephone Operator
- Ka Nerell as Office Girl
- Hjördis Petterson as Miss Berg
- Arnold Sjöstrand as Maître d'
- Ruth Stevens as Eva Zander
- Margit Tirkkonen as Telephone Operator
- Oscar Åberg as Accountant

== Bibliography ==
- Wallengren, Ann-Kristin. Welcome Home Mr Swanson: Swedish Emigrants and Swedishness on Film. Nordic Academic Press, 2014.
