= Brinsley Shaw =

American actor (1876–1931)

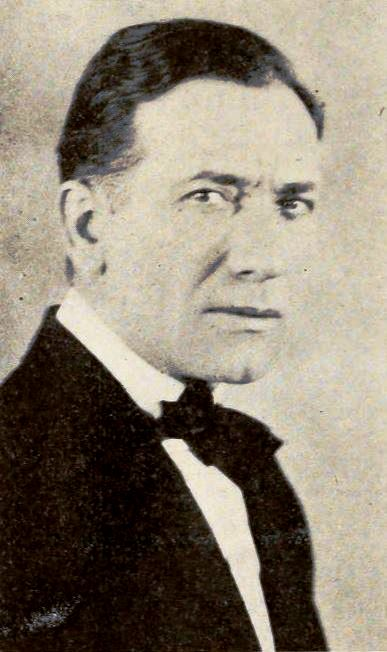
- Shawn in a 1919 publication
- Born: March 18, 1876; New York City, US
- Died: July 3, 1931 (aged 55); New York City, US
- Occupation: Silent film actor
- Years active: 1910–1927 (film)

Brinsley Shaw (March 18, 1876 – July 3, 1931) was an American stage, director, and film actor of the silent era. He worked in over 150 films from 1910 to 1927.

== Selected filmography ==
- Across the Plains (1911)
- The Tomboy on Bar Z (1912)
- The Wolf of Debt (1915)
- A Prince in a Pawnshop (1916)
- An Enemy to the King (1916)
- Arsene Lupin (1917)
- The Man of Mystery (1917)
- The Black Gate (1919)
- Hearts Are Trumps (1920)
- A Trip to Paradise (1921)
- The Curse of Drink (1922)
- The Strangers' Banquet (1922)
- Travelin' On (1922)
- The Barefoot Boy (1923)
- Stepping Lively (1924)
- The Cloud Rider (1925)
- Jimmie's Millions (1925)
- Before Midnight (1925)
- Don't (1925)
- The Prince of Pep (1925)
- Bucking the Truth (1926)
- The Dove (1927)

== Bibliography ==
- George A. Katchmer. A Biographical Dictionary of Silent Film Western Actors and Actresses. McFarland, 2009.
