= The Dictator (1915 film) =

1915 film by Edwin S. Porter

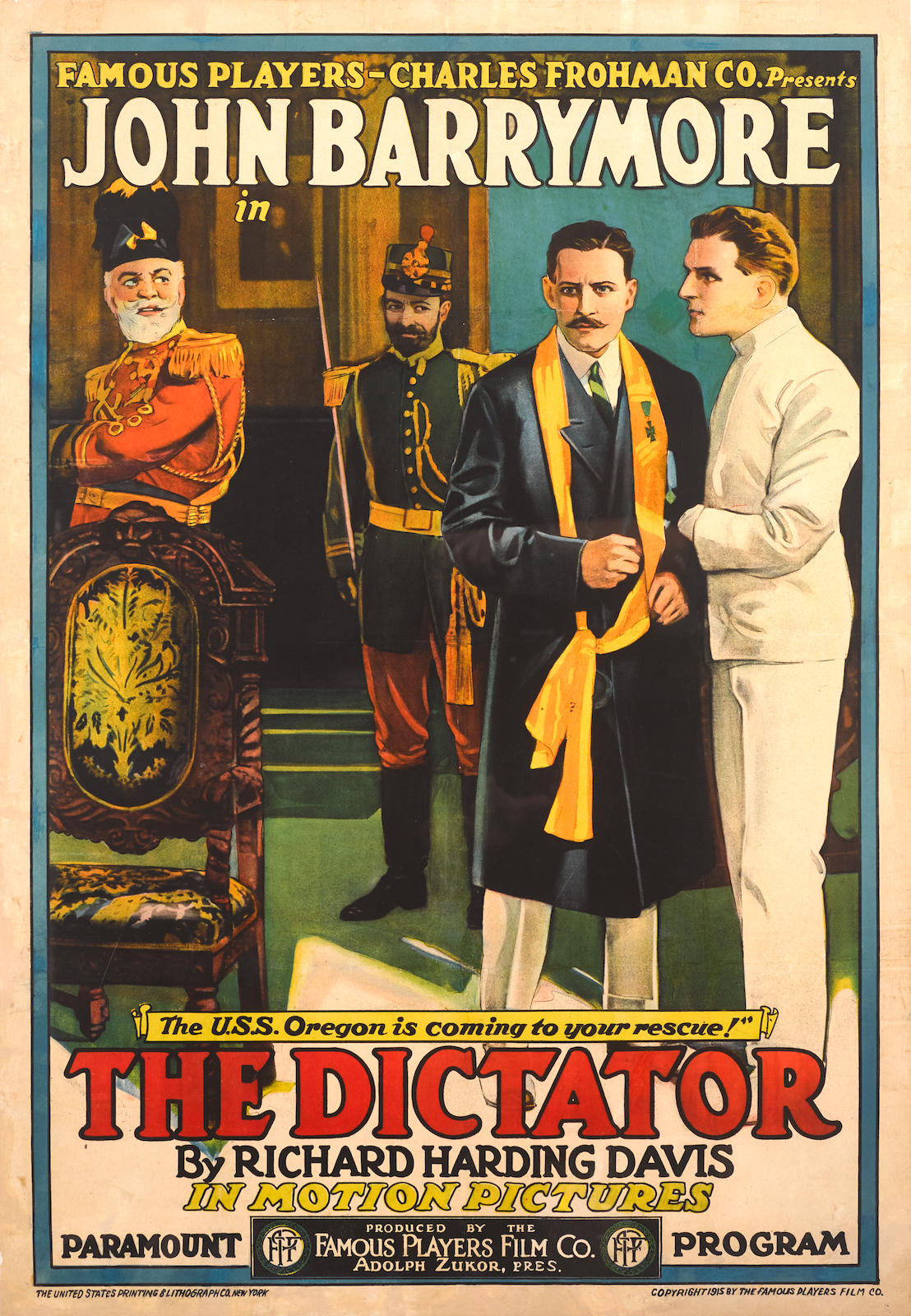
- Lobby poster
- Directed by: Oscar Eagle ? Edwin S. Porter
- Based on: The Dictator by Richard Harding Davis
- Produced by: Adolph Zukor, Charles Frohman Company
- Starring: John Barrymore
- Production company: Famous Players Film Company
- Distributed by: Paramount Pictures
- Release date: June 21, 1915
- Running time: 5 reels
- Country: United States
- Language: Silent (English intertitles)

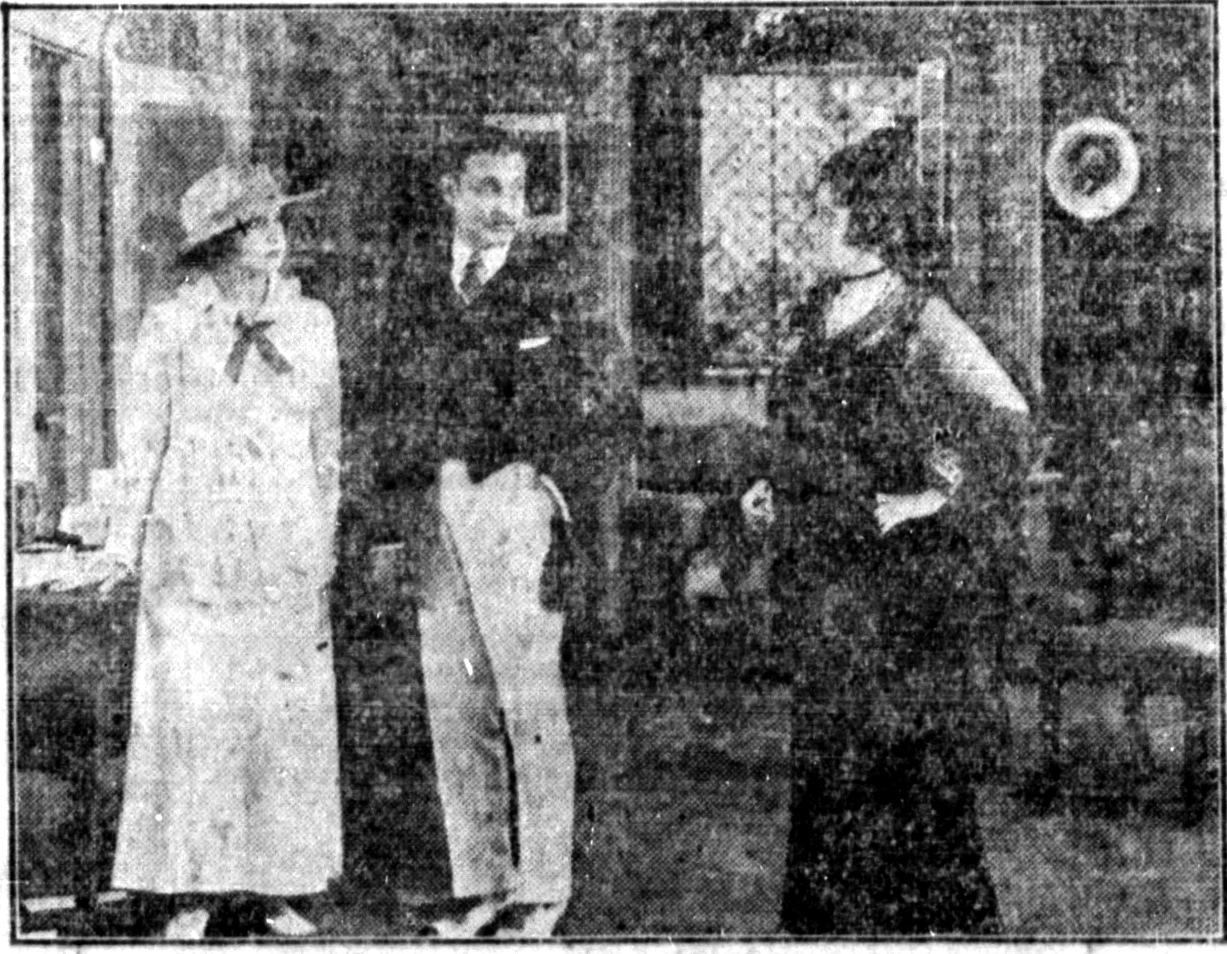
Scene from the film as published in a contemporary newspaper.

The Dictator is a 1915 American silent comedy film directed by Oscar Eagle and reputedly Edwin S. Porter. It was based on a play The Dictator by Richard Harding Davis and produced by Adolph Zukor (Famous Players Film Company) and the Charles Frohman Company. John Barrymore stars in a role played on the stage by William Collier Sr. whose company Barrymore had performed in this play. The film was rereleased on April 13, 1919 as part of the Paramount "Success Series" of their early screen successes. The story was refilmed in 1922 as The Dictator starring Wallace Reid. Today both films are lost.

The film was shot partially in Cuba.

== Cast ==
- John Barrymore as Brooke Travers
- Charlotte Ives as Lucy Sheridan
- Ruby Hoffman as Juanita
- Ivan F. Simpson as Simpson
- Walter Craven as General Campos
- Robert Broderick as Colonel Bowie
- Esther Lyon as Mrs. Bowie
- Henry West as Reverend Bostick (as Harry West)
- Mario Majeroni as General Rivas
- Thomas McGrath as Duffy

== See also ==
- John Barrymore on stage, screen and radio
- Edwin S. Porter filmography
