= Tea for Three =

1927 film

- Lobby card
- Directed by: Robert Z. Leonard
- Screenplay by: Garrett Graham; F. Hugh Herbert; Roi Cooper Megrue; Lucille Newmark
- Starring: Lew Cody; Aileen Pringle; Owen Moore
- Cinematography: André Barlatier -(French Wikipedia)
- Edited by: William LeVanway
- Production company: Metro-Goldwyn-Mayer
- Distributed by: Metro-Goldwyn-Mayer
- Release date: October 29, 1927
- Running time: 70 minutes
- Country: United States
- Language: English

Tea for Three is a lost 1927 American comedy silent film directed by Robert Z. Leonard and written by Garrett Graham, F. Hugh Herbert, Roi Cooper Megrue and Lucille Newmark. The film stars Lew Cody, Aileen Pringle, and Owen Moore. Supporting players were Phillips Smalley, Dorothy Sebastian and Edward Thomas. The film was released on October 29, 1927, by Metro-Goldwyn-Mayer.

== Cast ==
- Lew Cody as Carter Langford
- Aileen Pringle as Doris Langford
- Owen Moore as Philip Collamore
- Phillips Smalley as Harrington
- Dorothy Sebastian as Annette
- Edward Thomas as Austin, the butler
