= Potash and Perlmutter =

1923 film by Clarence G. Badger

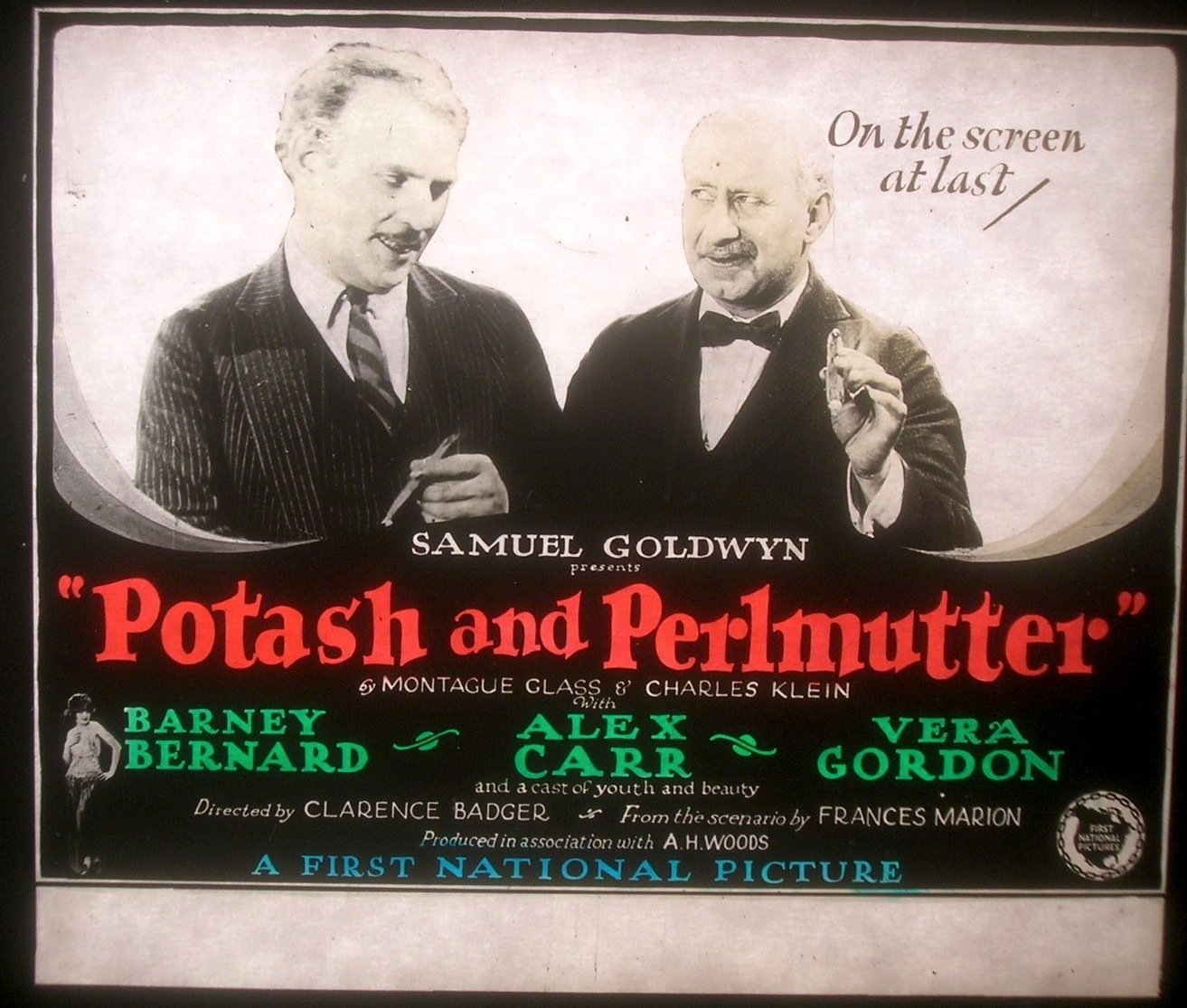
- Lantern slide
- Directed by: Clarence G. Badger
- Written by: Frances Marion (screenplay); Montague Glass (titles)
- Based on: Potash and Perlmutter by Montague Glass and Charles Klein
- Produced by: Samuel Goldwyn
- Production company: Samuel Goldwyn Productions
- Distributed by: Associated First National
- Release date: September 6, 1923
- Running time: 80 minutes
- Country: United States
- Language: Silent (English intertitles)

Potash and Perlmutter is a 1923 American silent comedy film directed by Clarence G. Badger. The film is based on an ethnic Jewish comedy with characters created by Montague Glass and Charles Klein for a 1913 Broadway play of the same name which ran for 441 performances. The play is based on the 1909 book of the same name by Montague Glass. This film is notable as the first release of Samuel Goldwyn's independent production company.

Stage stars Alexander Carr and Barney Bernard reprise their famous roles from the play in this film.

The film's success would inspire two Goldwyn sequels, In Hollywood with Potash and Perlmutter (1924) and Partners Again (1926). In 1927, the UK division of Phonofilm produced a short film with Augustus Yorke (1860-1939) and Nicholas Adams playing Potash and Perlmutter.

== Cast ==
- Alexander Carr as Morris Perlmutter
- Barney Bernard as Abe Potash
- Vera Gordon as Rosie Potash
- Martha Mansfield as The Head Model
- Ben Lyon as Boris Andrieff
- Edouard Durand as Feldman
- Hope Sutherland as Irma Potash
- De Sacia Mooers as Ruth Goldman
- Jerry Devine as The Office Boy
- Lee Kohlmar as Pasinsky
- Leo Donnelly as The Wide-Awake Salesman

== Preservation ==
With no prints of Potash and Perlmutter located in any film archives, it is considered a lost film.
