= A Prince in a Pawnshop =

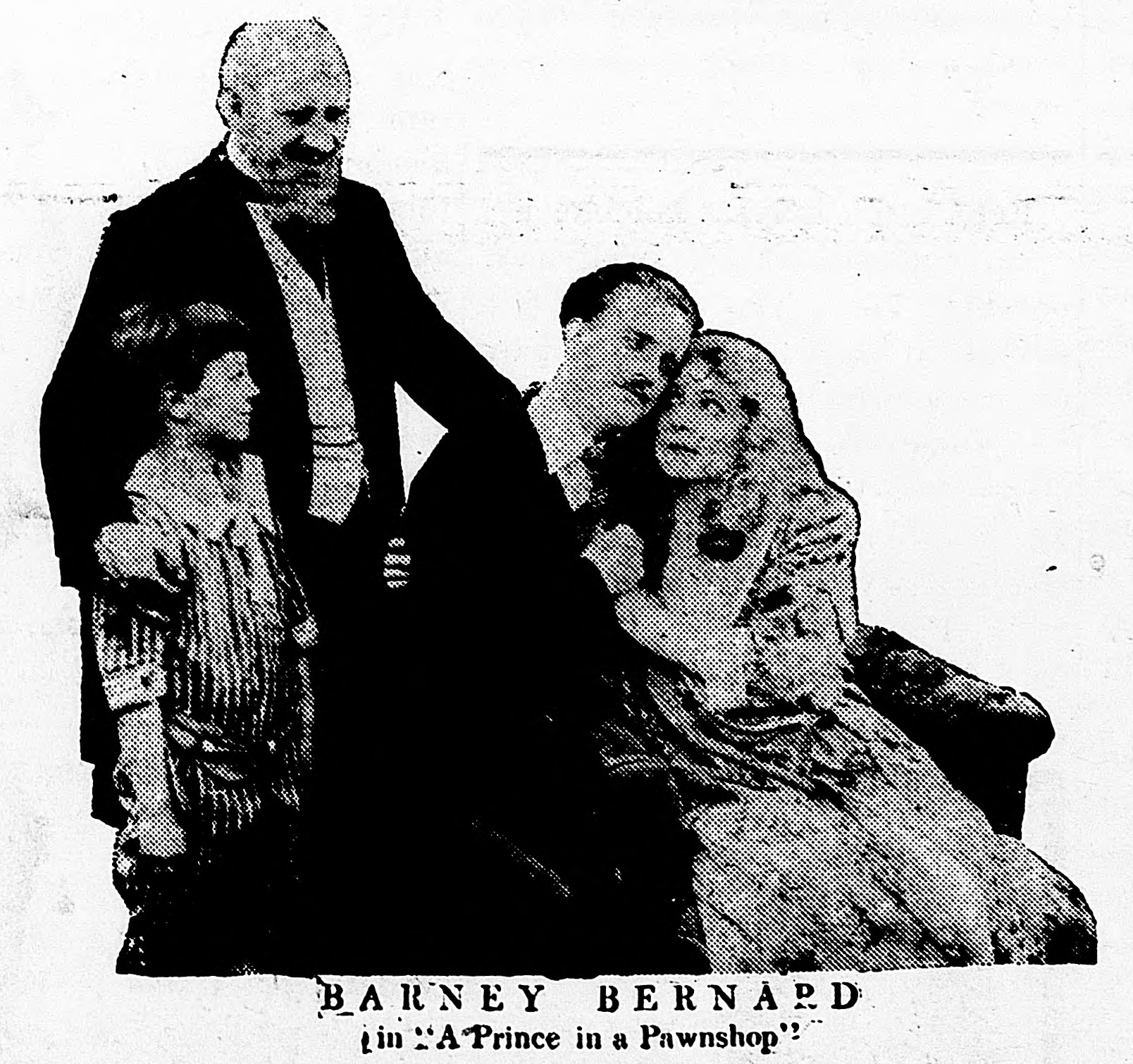
- Newspaper advertisement
- Directed by: Paul Scardon
- Written by: Garfield Thompson
- Based on: a story by Andrés de Segurola; Marie de Sarlabous(aka Jean Bart)
- Produced by: Vitagraph Company of America
- Starring: Barney Bernard; Bobby Connelly; Charlotte Ives
- Distributed by: Greater Vitagraph
- Release date: October 16, 1916
- Running time: 5 reels
- Country: United States
- Language: Silent...English titles

A Prince in a Pawnshop is a lost 1916 silent film directed by Paul Scardon and starring Barney Bernard. Vitagraph Company of America produced while it was released by Greater Vitagraph as a Blue Ribbon label.

== Cast ==
- Barney Bernard as David Solomon
- Garry McGarry as Maurice
- Bobby Connelly as Bobby
- Charlotte Ives as Ethel
- Edna Hunter as Mary Brown
- Brinsley Shaw as Thomas W. Stevins
- Lester Bernard as Abe Goldstein
