= Bucking the Truth =

1926 film

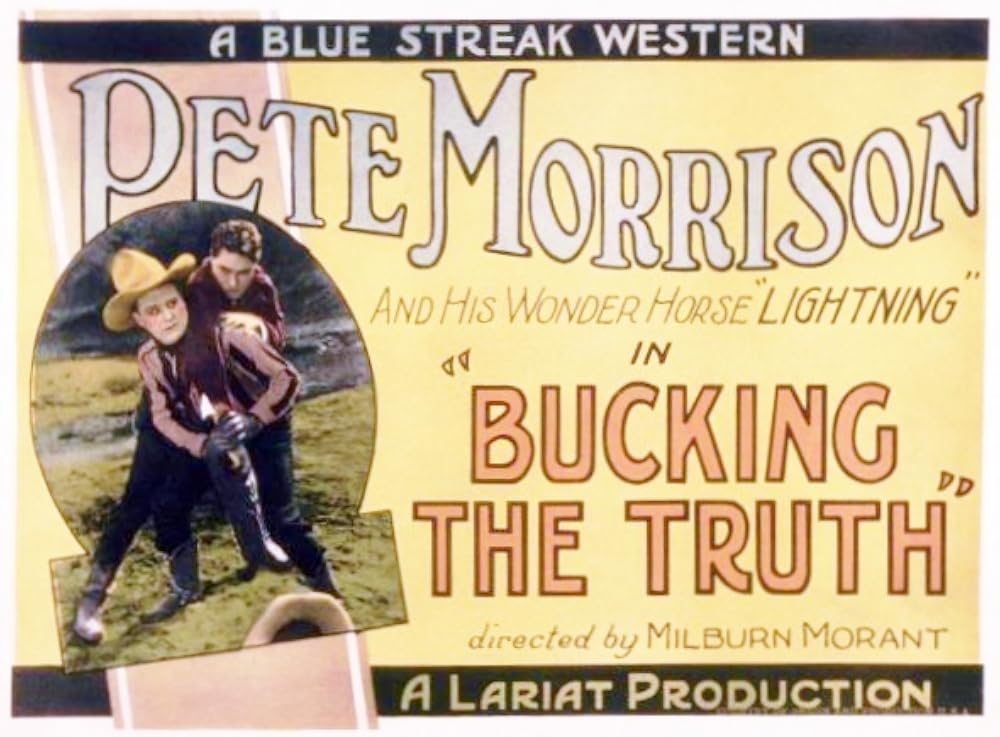
- Directed by: Milburn Morante
- Written by: Jay Inman Kane
- Produced by: Carl Laemmle
- Starring: Pete Morrison; Brinsley Shaw; Bruce Gordon
- Cinematography: Richard Fryer
- Production company: Universal Pictures
- Distributed by: Universal Pictures
- Release date: July 18, 1926
- Running time: 52 minutes
- Country: United States
- Languages: Silent; English intertitles

Bucking the Truth is a 1926 American silent Western film directed by Milburn Morante and starring Pete Morrison, Brinsley Shaw and Bruce Gordon.

== Plot ==
'Slim' Duane, a nomadic cowboy, finds himself compelled to swap clothes with an escaped criminal, which leads to suspicion falling on him for the murder of Sheriff Findlay. Evading the pursuing posse, he stumbles upon a gang of rustlers hidden in the hills who capture him. Meanwhile, another innocent man faces wrongful accusations and is on the brink of being executed. Slim's companions, 'Course-Gold' Charlie and his partner Anne, embark on a mission to save him.

== Cast ==
- Pete Morrison as 'Slim' Duane
- Brinsley Shaw as 'Coarse Gold' Charlie
- Bruce Gordon as Matt Holden
- William La Roche as Eben Purkiss
- Slim Whitaker as 'Red' Sang
- Ione Reed as Anne
- O. Robertson as Tom Bailey
- Vester Pegg as Sheriff Findlay

== Preservation ==
With no holdings located in archives, Bucking the Truth is considered a lost film.
