= The Beautiful Cheat (1926 film) =

1926 film

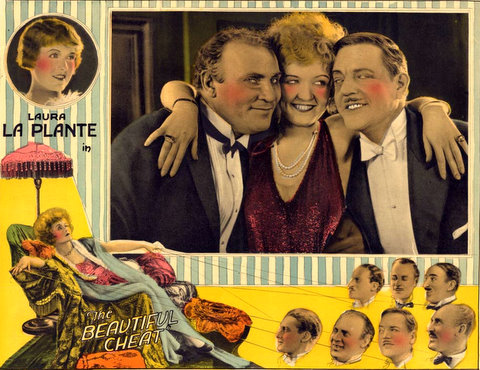
- Lobby card
- Directed by: Edward Sloman
- Written by: Olga Printzlau; Nina Wilcox Putnam; Andrew Percival Younger
- Starring: Laura La Plante; Alexander Carr; Harry Myers
- Cinematography: Jackson Rose
- Production company: Universal Pictures
- Distributed by: Universal Pictures
- Release date: February 21, 1926
- Running time: 70 minutes
- Country: United States
- Language: Silent (English intertitles)

The Beautiful Cheat is a 1926 American silent comedy film directed by Edward Sloman and starring Laura La Plante, Alexander Carr, and Harry Myers.

== Plot ==
As described in a film magazine review, motion picture studio magnate has press agent Jimmy Austin take pretty shop clerk Mary Callahan abroad where she is transformed using publicity methods into the Russian actress Maritza Callahansky, who is advertised as having the crown jewels. Returning to the United States, the publicity game continues. Maritza throws a party at a Long Island mansion while the rightful owner is absent. However, the owner's unexpected sudden return causes momentary confusion, but the situation is straightened out by the son of the family, who has joined the film acting brigade. Jimmy and Mary decide to marry.

== Cast ==
- Laura La Plante as Mary Callahan / Maritza Callahansky
- Alexander Carr as Albert Goldringer
- Harry Myers as Jimmy Austin
- Kate Price as Kate 'Ma' Callahan
- Tom Guise as Leland Bruckman
- Helen Carr as Lady Violet Armington
- Walter Perry as Tom 'Pa' Callahan
- Helen Dunbar as Mrs. Leland Bruckman
- Bertram Grassby as Marquis de la Pontenac
- Robert Anderson as Dan Brodie
- Youcca Troubetzkov as Herbert Dangerfield
- Max Barwyn as Waiter (uncredited)
- Louise Gibney as Meritza's Maid (uncredited)
- Leo White as French Dramatic Coach (uncredited)

== Preservation ==
A print of The Beautiful Cheat is held at the UCLA Film and Television Archive.

== Bibliography ==
- Munden, Kenneth White. The American Film Institute Catalog of Motion Pictures Produced in the United States, Part 1. University of California Press, 1997.
