= Seven Chances (play) =

Seven Chances is a 1916 play written by Roi Cooper Megrue and produced by David Belasco. It opened on 8 August 1916 at the George M. Cohan's Theatre and closed in December 1916 after 151 performances.

== Adaptations ==
The play was adapted in 1925 as Seven Chances and in 1999 as The Bachelor.
