= April Fool (1926 film) =

1926 film

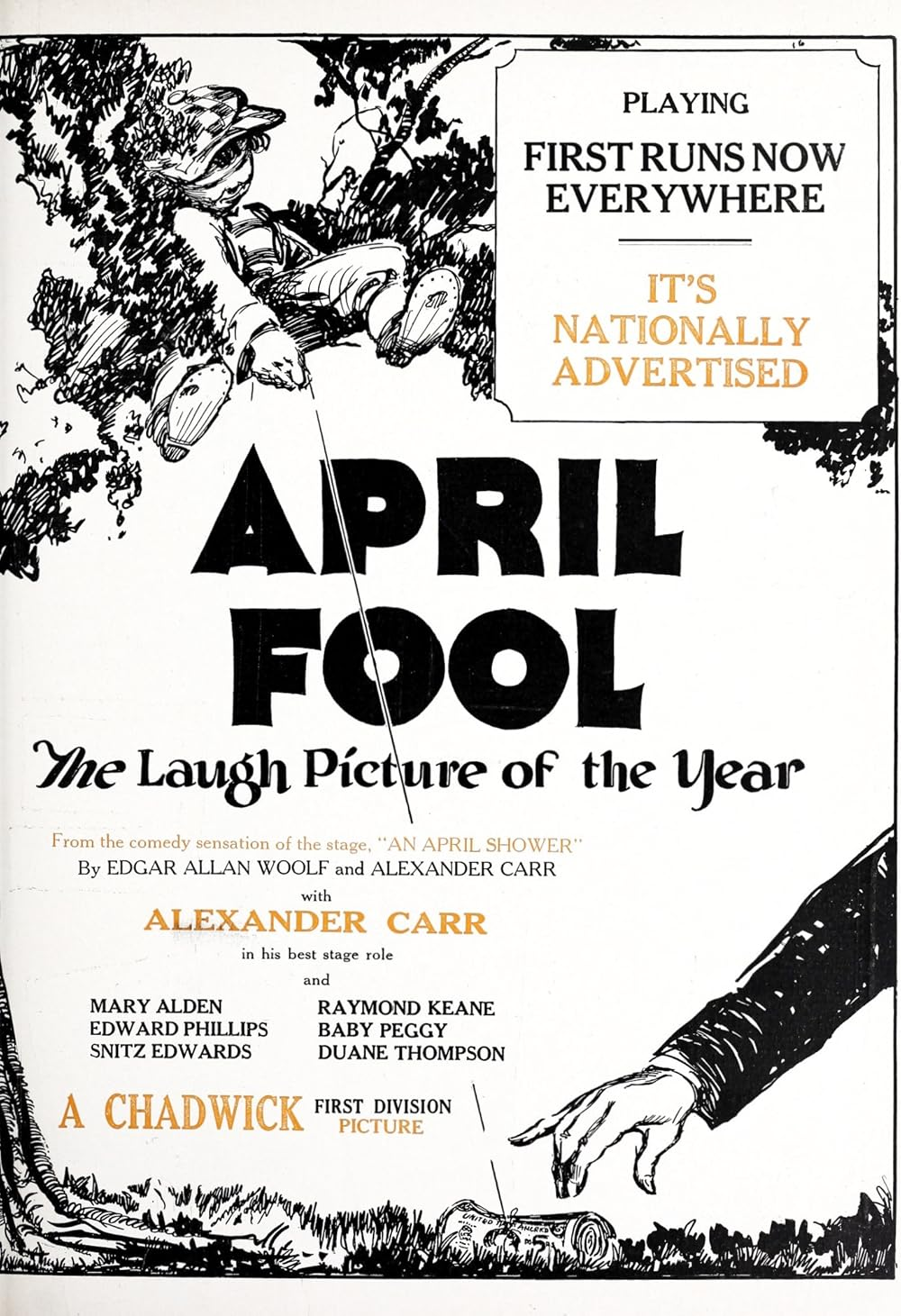
- Directed by: Nat Ross
- Written by: Zion Myers
- Based on: a play by Alexander Carr and Edgar Allan Woolf
- Produced by: Chadwick Pictures
- Cinematography: L. William O'Connell
- Distributed by: Chadwick Pictures
- Release date: November 15, 1926
- Running time: 63 minutes
- Country: USA
- Language: Silent..English titles

April Fool is an American romantic comedy silent film released in 1926. The 67 minute black and white film with subtitles stars Baby Peggy, Alexander Carr and Duane Thompson. It was directed by Nat Ross. Prints of April Fool exist in a private film collection and in the Library of Congress film archive.

== Plot ==
The film concern about a worker struggling to make ends meet in a Jewish neighborhood in the city, his daughter, his love interest, and his daughter's prankster friend.

The main character loses his job pressing clothes in a tailor sweatshop and resorts to selling used umbrellas. His love interest is a widow who runs a deli where his daughter is looked after.

== Cast ==
- Alexander Carr - Jacob Goodman
- Duane Thompson - Irma Goodman
- Mary Alden - Amelia Rosen
- Raymond Keane - Leon Steinfield
- Eddie Phillips - Joseph Applebaum
- Snitz Edwards - Mr. Applebaum
- Nat Carr - Moisha Ginsburg
- Baby Peggy - Irma Goodman, as a Child
- Pat Moore - Joe Applebaum, as a Child
- Leon Holmes - Leon Steinfield, as a Child
