= A Trip to Paradise (film) =

1921 film directed by Maxwell Karger

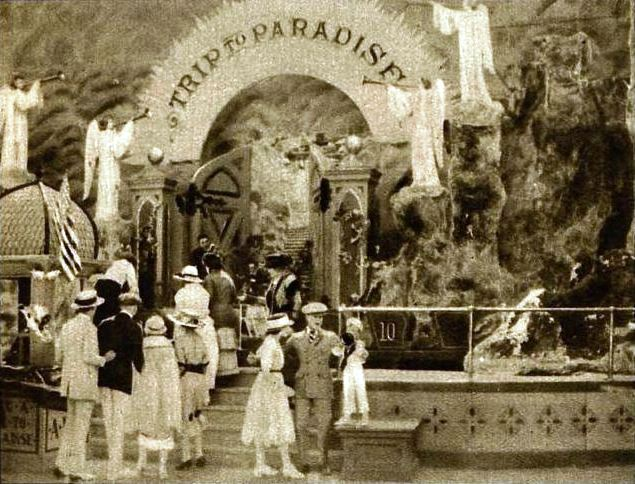
- Still from the film
- Directed by: Maxwell Karger
- Written by: June Mathis
- Based on: the play, Liliom by: Ferenc Molnár
- Starring: Bert Lytell; Virginia Valli; Brinsley Shaw
- Cinematography: Arthur Martinelli
- Production company: Metro Pictures
- Release date: September 5, 1921 (US)
- Running time: 6 reels
- Country: United States
- Language: English

A Trip to Paradise is a 1921 American silent drama film directed by Maxwell Karger and starring Bert Lytell, Virginia Valli, and Brinsley Shaw. It was released on September 5, 1921. No prints of the film are known to survive, so it is currently classified as lost.

== Plot summary ==
The story follows Curley Flynn, a rough-mannered carousel barker working at Coney Island. He falls in love with Nora O'Brien, an innocent young maid. Following their romance, both lose their jobs and soon face severe financial hardship. Out of desperation to provide, Curley gets entangled in a criminal plot. The robbery goes wrong, resulting in Curley's death. In the afterlife, Curley finds himself before a heavenly judge. Granted a temporary chance at redemption, he is allowed to return to Earth briefly. He performs a final, selfless good deed for Nora, which ultimately earns his soul eternal peace.

== Cast ==
- Bert Lytell as Curley Flynn
- Virginia Valli as Nora O'Brien
- Brinsley Shaw as Meek
- Unice Vin Moore as Widow Boland
- Victory Bateman as Mrs. Smiley
- Eva Gordon as Mary
- Nigel de Brulier as Heavenly Judge

== Production ==
Exteriors for A Trip to Paradise were filmed in Glendale, California.

== Reception ==
Camera! and the Exhibitors Herald's reviews were positive, both praising the acting of the cast.
