= Partners Again =

1926 film by Henry King

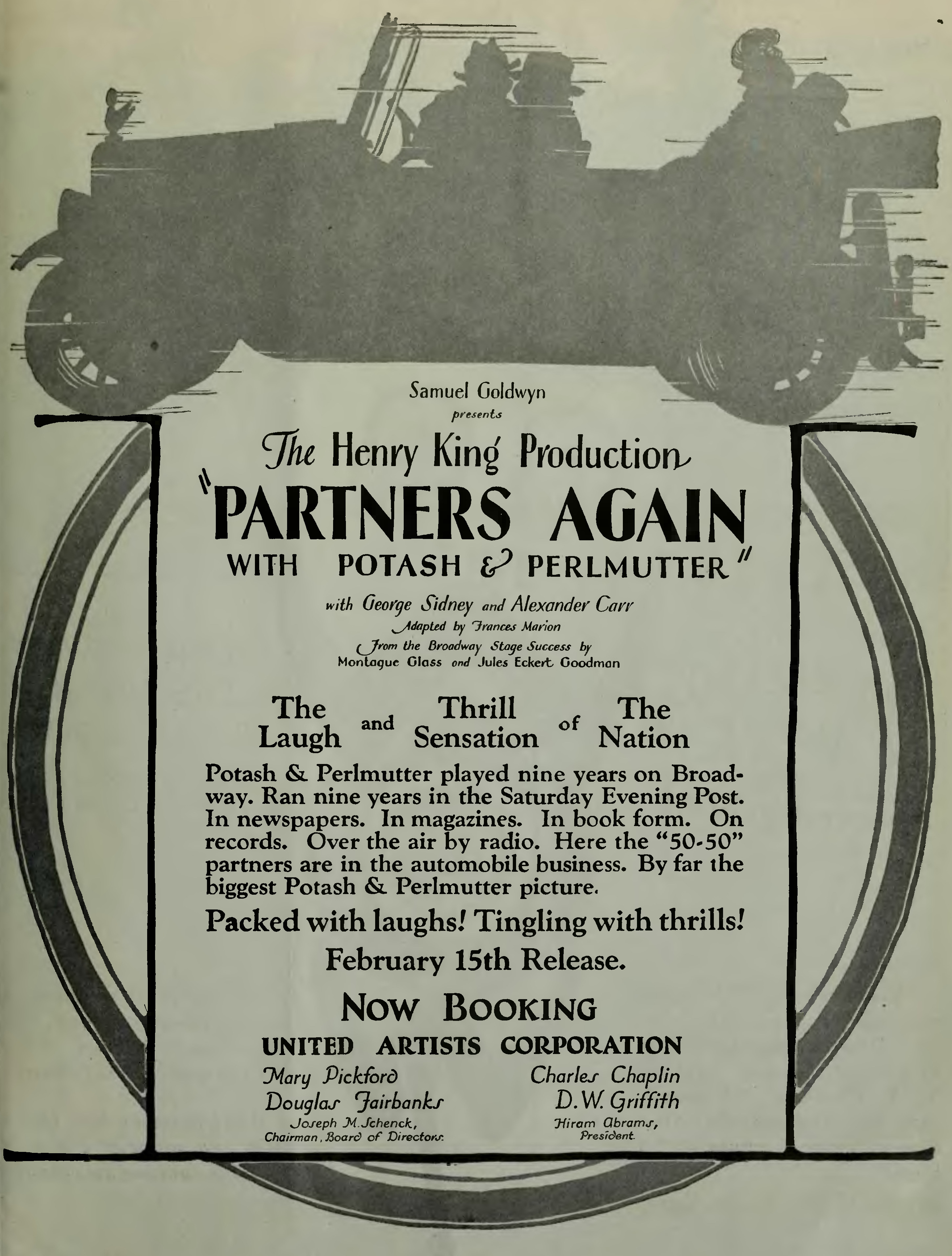
- Directed by: Henry King
- Written by: Frances Marion (screenplay); Jules Eckert Goodman (play); Montague Glass (play); Montague Glass (titles)
- Produced by: Samuel Goldwyn
- Cinematography: Arthur Edeson
- Production company: Samuel Goldwyn Productions
- Distributed by: United Artists
- Release date: February 15, 1926
- Running time: 60 min.
- Country: United States
- Language: Silent (English intertitles)

Partners Again is a 1926 American silent comedy film that was produced by Samuel Goldwyn, released through United Artists, and directed by Henry King.

This ethnic Jewish humor film is based on the 1922 Broadway play Partners Again starring Alex Carr and Barney Bernard, which reprises their characters from the very successful 1913 Broadway play Potash and Perlmutter (which had 441 performances from 1913 to 1915). Goldwyn produced a 1923 film adaptation of Potash and Perlmutter, and a 1924 sequel called In Hollywood with Potash and Perlmutter. In Partners Again the two are in the automobile industry.

As with the 1924 film, In Hollywood with Potash and Perlmutter, George Sidney plays Potash, taking up the role after Barney Bernard died in March of that year. Alex Carr continues his winning role of Perlmutter.

== Plot ==
As described in a film magazine review, Abe Potash and Mawruss Perlmutter are in the automobile business. Abe's niece Hattie falls in love with mechanic Dan, sidetracking the wealthy suitor Schenckmann. Abe has a tough time in court following a disastrous demonstration by himself and his partner of the powers of the Schenckmann Six automobile to prospective buyers. He secretly gives Hattie $500 for a wedding present. Later Abe is fooled in a stock swindle and runs away with Mawruss on an airplane flight. During the flight, Abe is almost knocked overboard, but is saved when his nightgown catches a hook. The two men are brought back by Hattie and Dan, the latter having made a fortune in Chemicals, and all is well.

== Production ==
The California Coupe aircraft was damaged in a stunt during production of this film. This led to a lawsuit with the owner of the plane.

== Cast ==
- George Sidney as Abe Potash
- Alexander Carr as Mawruss Perlmutter
- Betty Jewel as Hattie Potash
- Allan Forrest as Dan
- Robert Schable as Schenckmann
- Lillian Elliott as Rosie Potash
- Earl Metcalfe as Aviator
- Lew Brice as Pazinsky
- Gilbert Clayton as Sammett
- Anna Gilbert as Mrs. Sammett

== Preservation ==
According to the former director of the UCLA Film and Television Archive, a print of the film exists in 8mm at UCLA and that print was scanned around 2013.

== See also ==
- California Coupe (aircraft damaged in stunt)
