= The Man of Mystery =

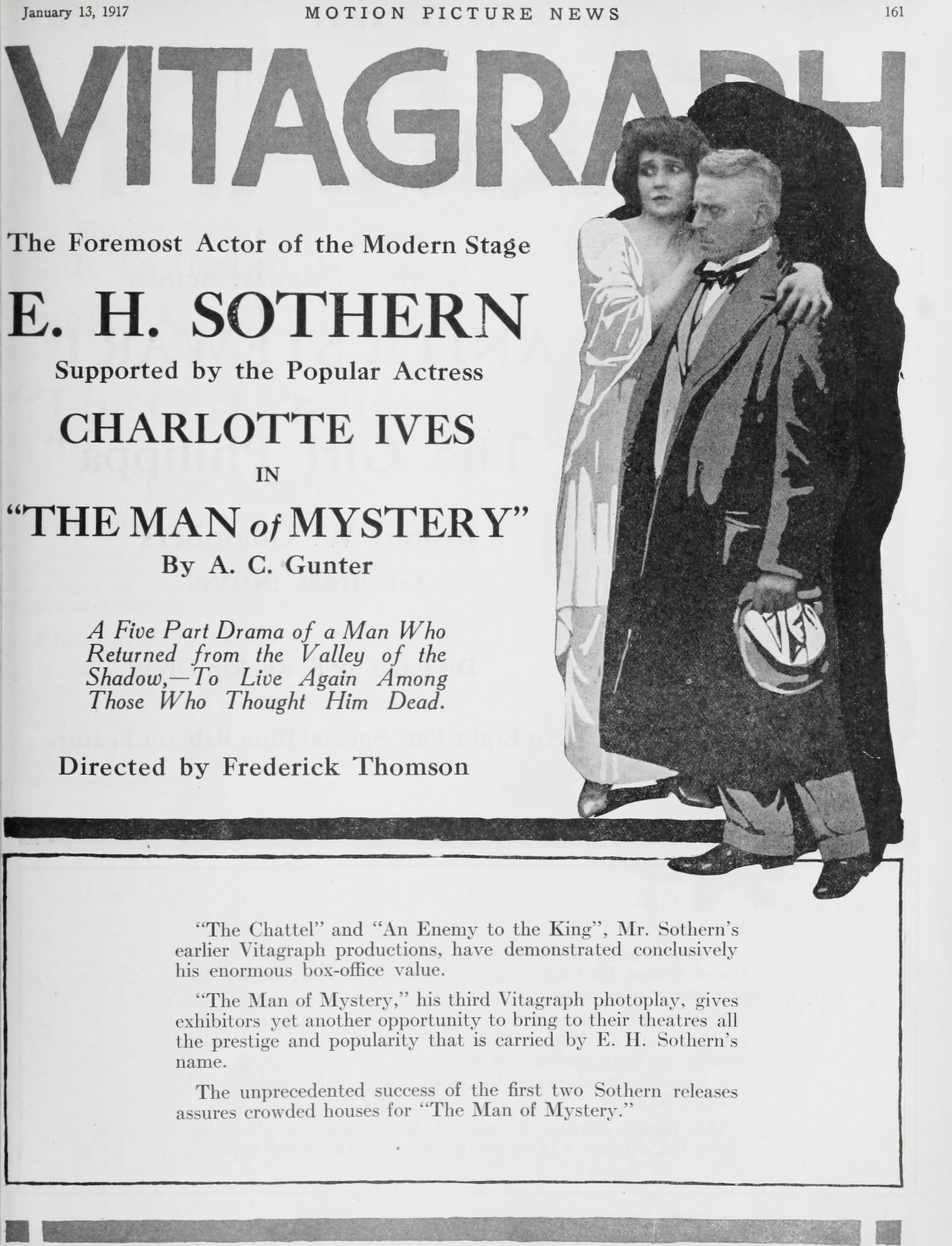
- Directed by: Frederick A. Thomson
- Written by: Archibald Clavering Gunter (novel); Helmer Walton Bergman
- Produced by: Albert E. Smith
- Starring: E.H. Sothern; Charlotte Ives; Gilda Varesi Archibald
- Cinematography: Charles J. Davis
- Production company: Vitagraph Company of America
- Distributed by: Greater Vitagraph
- Release date: January 8, 1917
- Running time: 50 minutes
- Country: United States
- Languages: Silent; English intertitles

The Man of Mystery is a 1917 American drama film directed by Frederick A. Thomson and starring E.H. Sothern, Charlotte Ives and Gilda Varesi Archibald.

== Cast ==
- E.H. Sothern as David Angelo
- Charlotte Ives as Clara Angelo
- Gilda Varesi Archibald as Mme. Brunschaut
- Mr. Roberts as Baron Rocco
- Brinsley Shaw as Pietro Stroggi
- Bernard Siegel as Signor Casa

== Bibliography ==
- John T. Soister, Henry Nicolella & Steve Joyce. American Silent Horror, Science Fiction and Fantasy Feature Films, 1913-1929. McFarland, 2014.
