= The Bachelor (1999 film) =

- Theatrical release poster
- Directed by: Gary Sinyor
- Screenplay by: Steve Cohen
- Based on: Seven Chances by Roi Cooper Megrue Seven Chances (screenplay) by Jean C. Havez; Joseph A. Mitchell; Clyde Bruckman
- Produced by: Jeffrey T. Barabe; Bing Howenstein; Lloyd Segan
- Starring: Chris O'Donnell; Renée Zellweger; Hal Holbrook; James Cromwell; Artie Lange; Edward Asner; Marley Shelton; Peter Ustinov
- Cinematography: Simon Archer
- Edited by: Robert M. Reitano; Florence Vinger
- Music by: David A. Hughes; John Murphy
- Production company: George Street Pictures
- Distributed by: New Line Cinema
- Release date: November 5, 1999
- Running time: 101 minutes
- Country: United States
- Language: English
- Budget: $21 million
- Box office: $36.9 million

The Bachelor is a 1999 American romantic comedy-drama film directed by Gary Sinyor and written by Steve Cohen. It is a remake of the 1925 Buster Keaton silent comedy film Seven Chances and stars Chris O'Donnell and Renée Zellweger. The film received negative reviews from critics and grossed $36.9 million against its $21 million budget. This film also marks Mariah Carey's acting debut.

== Plot ==
Bachelor Jimmie Shannon runs a pool table company that his family owns. After spoiling his proposal to Anne, his girlfriend of three years, he discovers that his grandfather has died and left him the family business (worth $100 million) under the conditions that he be married by 6:05 p.m on his 30th birthday (the next day), that he not be apart from his bride for more than one night each month over the next 10 years, and that they must attempt to produce a child sometime during the first five years of their marriage, leading the bachelor, his friends, and a priest to scramble over the next few hours in search of a bride.

If Jimmie fails, business competitor Oden Sports will buy the company and put Jimmy’s employees out of work. Meanwhile, Anne has second thoughts which she shares with her sister Natalie. She talks Anne into going home to go visit their parents for the night.

A desperate Jimmie opens a shoebox full of photos of old girlfriends, and begins to track them down. First he sees Stacey, an oil futures trader, who turns out to be engaged. Second is Zoe, a window dresser. Jimmie goes to see her, but just after, he runs off after a woman who he thinks is Anne. He returns to find Zoe has set a mannequin on fire.

He strikes out with an opera singer and a cop. Soon his list is depleted, but his last choice, Buckley, accepts: she detests Jimmie but wants his money to prop up her family's fortune. As the priest tries to conduct the ceremony, she gradually learns the other conditions of the will. Horrified, she drives away.

Anne misses Jimmie and heads back to the city. Trying to locate him, she calls Marco to arrange dinner with Jimmie.

As everyone scrambles to help Jimmie save the family business, Jimmie realizes the "effect" of marriage, as the priest reveals how he took on the priesthood after his wife died, and that he was proud to be married and produce a family in the process.

Realizing that he loves Anne and is ready to "take the plunge", Jimmie, after being up all night, rests in the church where Marco had promised to deliver a bride. He awakens to find hundreds of women dressed as brides waiting for him. After trying to settle the women down, Marco lies and says it was all a prank. Marco reveals that Anne is on her way back, so Jimmie flees to the train station, ordering a cake on the way. He makes it there after escaping the brides. He finds Anne in the train, but she has discovered a newspaper with its front page asking, "Would you marry this man for $100 million?" with Jimmie's picture beside. She is upset, but he professes his love for her and they reconcile.

Natalie finds a discarded wedding dress in the station, and Anne puts it on in the bathroom. She opens the door to see hundreds of brides run past, chasing Jimmie. Jimmie flees. He eventually climbs up a flight on a fire escape and shouts for Anne, as the brides gather below. The priest begins to conduct the ceremony over a loudspeaker from inside a police car, causing many "brides" to attack the car. Anne, in the crowd, makes her way through and up to Jimmie. Anne convinces the other women to be happy and let it be her day.

The priest finishes the ceremony by pronouncing them husband and wife, to cheers from all, and Jimmie and Anne kiss. They made it just in time before the deadline of 6:05 p.m. to inherit $100 million. She then tosses her bouquet into the teeming crowd below.

== Cast ==
- Chris O'Donnell as Jimmie Shannon
- Renée Zellweger as Anne Arden
- Hal Holbrook as Roy O'Dell
- James Cromwell as The Priest
- Artie Lange as Marco
- Edward Asner as Sid Gluckman
- Marley Shelton as Natalie Arden
- Peter Ustinov as Grandad James Shannon
- Sarah Silverman as Carolyn
- Stacy Edwards as Zoe
- Rebecca Cross as Stacey
- Jennifer Esposito as Daphne
- Katharine Towne as Monique
- Mariah Carey as Ilana
- Brooke Shields as Buckley Hale-Windsor
- Anastasia Horne as Peppy Boor
- Pat Finn as Bolt

== Soundtrack ==
The film score was composed by David A. Hughes (formerly of OMD) and John Murphy. The soundtrack also features a number of songs recorded by popular artists.

| No. | Title | Writer(s) | Artist | Length |
|---|---|---|---|---|
| 1. | "Don't Fence Me In" (originally by Roy Rogers) | Cole Porter, Robert Fletcher | David Byrne | 3:30 |
| 2. | "It Must Be Love" (originally by Labi Siffre) | Claudius Siffre | Madness | 3:48 |
| 3. | "(Your Love Keeps Lifting Me) Higher and Higher" | Berry Gordy, Tyran Carlo | Jackie Wilson | 3:01 |
| 4. | "Just a Gigolo/I Ain't Got Nobody" | Leonello Casucci, Julius Brammer (English lyrics by Irving Caesar) / Spencer Williams, Roger A. Graham | Louis Prima | 4:43 |
| 5. | "Hernando's Hideaway" | Jerry Ross, Richard Adler | Billy May's Rico Mambo Orchestra | 2:19 |
| 6. | "Cha Cha on the Moon" | Charles Rose, Ronnie Bridges | Pat Reader | 1:45 |
| 7. | "Little Arrows" | Albert Hammond, Mike Hazlewood | Leapy Lee | 2:41 |
| 8. | "You're the First, the Last, My Everything" | Barry Carter, Tony Sepe, Peter Sterling Radcliffe | Barry White | 3:27 |
| 9. | "The First Time Ever I Saw Your Face" (originally by Roberta Flack) | Ewan MacColl | Jane Powell | 4:23 |
| 10. | "Hit the Road Jack" (originally by Ray Charles) | Percy Mayfield | Buster Poindexter | 3:18 |

== Release ==
=== Critical reception ===
On the review aggregator website Rotten Tomatoes, 8% of 71 critics' reviews are positive, with an average rating of 3.6/10. The website's critics' consensus reads, "Clichéd, witless and irritating, The Bachelor proves Chris O'Donnell is no Buster Keaton." Metacritic, which uses a weighted average, assigned the film a score of 31 out of 100, based on 26 critics, indicating "generally unfavorable" reviews. Audiences surveyed by CinemaScore gave the film an average grade of "B−" on an A+ to F scale.

Stephen Holden on The New York Times said the film "builds up some of the zip of a silent-film comedy, although its satire is too broad to carry much of a sting."

=== Box office ===
The film opened at number 3 at the North American box office behind The Bone Collector and House on Haunted Hill making $7.5 million USD in its opening weekend. The Bachelor ultimately grossed $37 million worldwide making it a modest box office success.
