= George M. Cohan's Theatre =

Broadway theater (1911–1938)

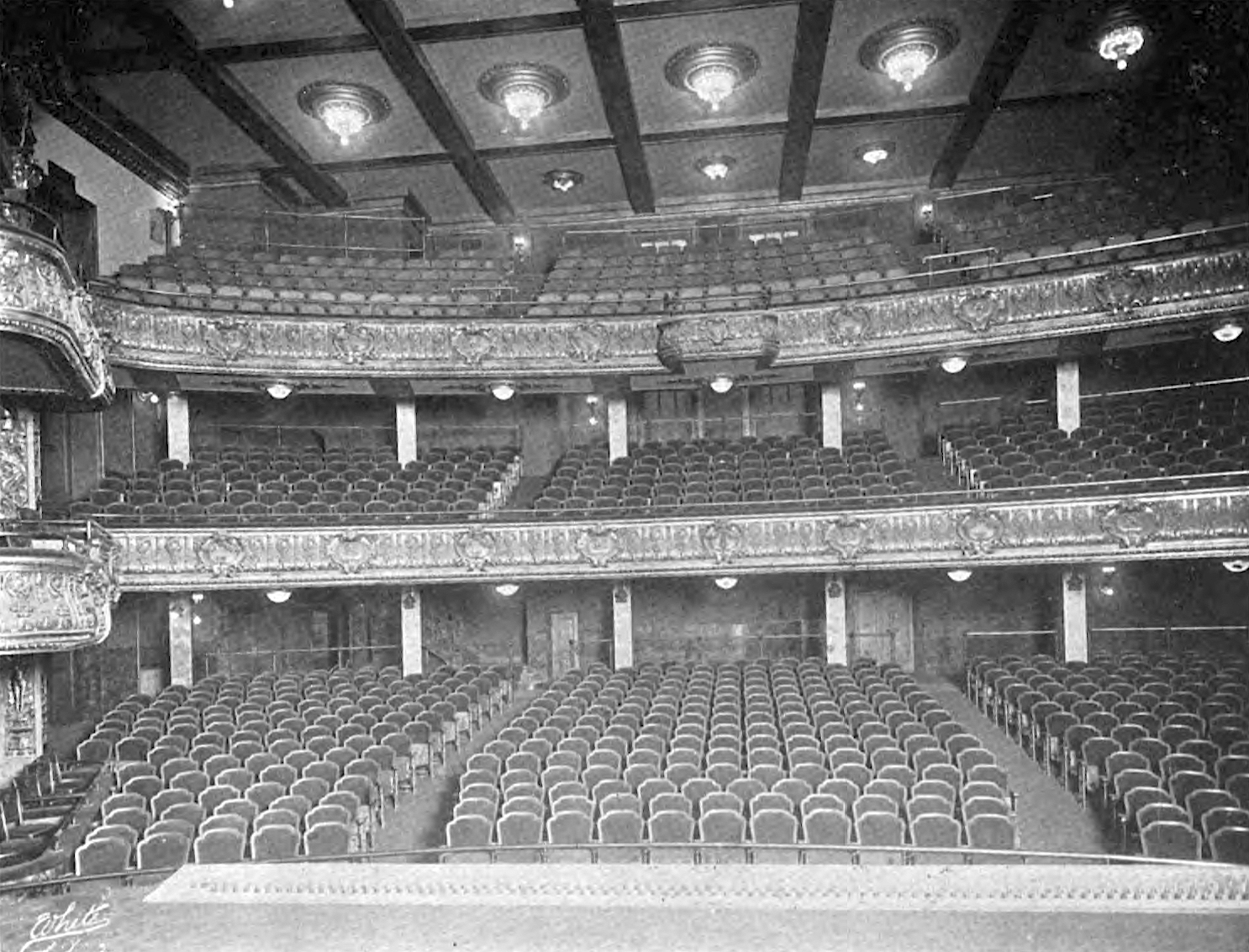
- View of house from the stage, 1911
- Interactive map of George M. Cohan's Theatre
- Address: 1482 Broadway (Broadway and West 43rd Street); New York City; United States of America
- Coordinates: 40°45′23″N 73°59′9″W
- Capacity: 1,086
- Current use: Demolished

Construction
- Opened: 1911
- Closed: 1938

George M. Cohan's Theatre was a Broadway theatre at 1482 Broadway at the intersection with West 43rd Street in the Midtown Manhattan neighborhood of New York City. It was built in 1911 and demolished in 1938.

== History ==
The theatre was designed by George Keister, and opened on February 13, 1911, starting with George M. Cohan's Get-Rich-Quick Wallingford, which moved from the Gaiety Theatre which Cohan also owned.

Cohan considered the theatre to be a celebration of his career, with exhibits and murals of his work on display. 1911's The Little Millionaire was the first hit of the theatre. Potash and Perlmutter (1913) was a very big hit. In 1915, Cohan and his partner Sam H. Harris sold the theatre to Joe Leblang, a big discount ticket seller. Leblang had A. L. Erlanger manage the theatre. The theatre started also showing motion pictures by the early 1920s on the weekend, eventually making more money through that source than plays. The 1925 film version of Ben Hur had a long run. By 1933, the theatre stopped hosting live theatre altogether, the Great Depression affecting Broadway significantly. The entire Fitzgerald Building and the theatre in which it was housed was demolished in late 1938. It is currently the site of 4 Times Square.

== Select productions ==
The below list includes most if not all of the theatre's productions which exceeded 100 performances:

- Get-Rich-Quick Wallingford (opening play, February 13, 1911)
- The Little Millionaire (Sept 1911 – March 1912, 192 perf.)
- Broadway Jones (Sept 1912 – Feb 1913, 176 perf.)
- Potash and Perlmutter (Aug 1913 – Sept 1915, 441 total perf.)
- It Pays to Advertise (Sept 1914 – Aug 1915, 399 total perf.)
- Pom-pom (Feb – June 1916, 128 perf.)
- Seven Chances (Aug – Dec 1916, 151 perf.)
- Come Out of the Kitchen (Oct 1916 – May 1917, 224 perf.)
- The King (Nov 1917 – Mar 1918, 127 perf.)
- Head Over Heels (Aug 1918 – Nov 1918, 100 perf.)
- A Prince There Was (Dec 1918 – May 1919, 159 perf.)
- The Hottentot (Mar 1920 – Jun 1920, 113 perf.)
- The Tavern (Sept 1920 – May 1921, 252 perf.)
- Two Little Girls in Blue (May – Aug 1921, 135 perf.)
- The Perfect Fool (Nov 1921 – July 1922, 275 perf.)
- The Love Child (Nov 1922 – Apr 1923, 167 perf.)
- Adrienne (May 1923 – Dec 1923, 235 perf.)
- The Haunted House (Sept – Dec 1924, 103 perf.)
- Desire Under the Elms (July – Sept 1925, a portion of a total NYC run of 420 perf.)
- The 19th Hole (Oct 1927 – Jan 1928, 119 perf.)
- Rain or Shine (Feb – Dec 1928, 356 perf.)
- Hello, Daddy (Dec 1928 – June 1929, 198 perf.)
- There You Are (1932, last legitimate production)
