= No Greater Love (1932 film) =

- Directed by: Lewis Seiler
- Written by: Isadore Bernstein
- Produced by: Benjamin Stoloff
- Starring: Dickie Moore; Alexander Carr; Richard Bennett
- Cinematography: William C. Thompson
- Production company: Columbia Pictures
- Distributed by: Columbia Pictures
- Release date: June 4, 1932
- Running time: 60 minutes
- Country: United States
- Language: English

No Greater Love is a 1932 drama film directed by Lewis Seiler. It stars Dickie Moore and Alexander Carr.

== Plot ==
Sidney Cohen, the owner of a deli cares for everyone and is Jewish. Mildred and her mom live above the deli, they are Irish Catholic and Mildred is also unable to walk she spends her time in a wheelchair. When Mildreds mom dies Sidney adopts her. When they hear of a surgeon that could potentially fix her legs Sidney sells a portion of his deli in hope of it working. When the surgery doesn't work the misfortune follows with Mildred getting sent away to the orphanage. Sidney realizes he doesn't have much will to live without Mildred and ends up getting pneumonia. Mildred is able to leave the orphanage and help him back to good health and ends with a miracle and them being reunited.

== Cast ==
- Dickie Moore as Tommy Burns
- Alexander Carr as Sidney Cohen
- Richard Bennett as Surgeon
- Beryl Mercer as Mrs. Burns
- Hobart Bosworth as Doctor
- Betty Jane Graham as Mildred Flannigan
- Alec B. Francis as Priest
- Mischa Auer as Rabbi
- Helen Jerome Eddy as Superintendent

== Reception ==
Film critic Martin Dickstein of the Brooklyn Eagle criticized the film for being excessively melodramatic.
