= Seven Chances =

1925 film by Buster Keaton

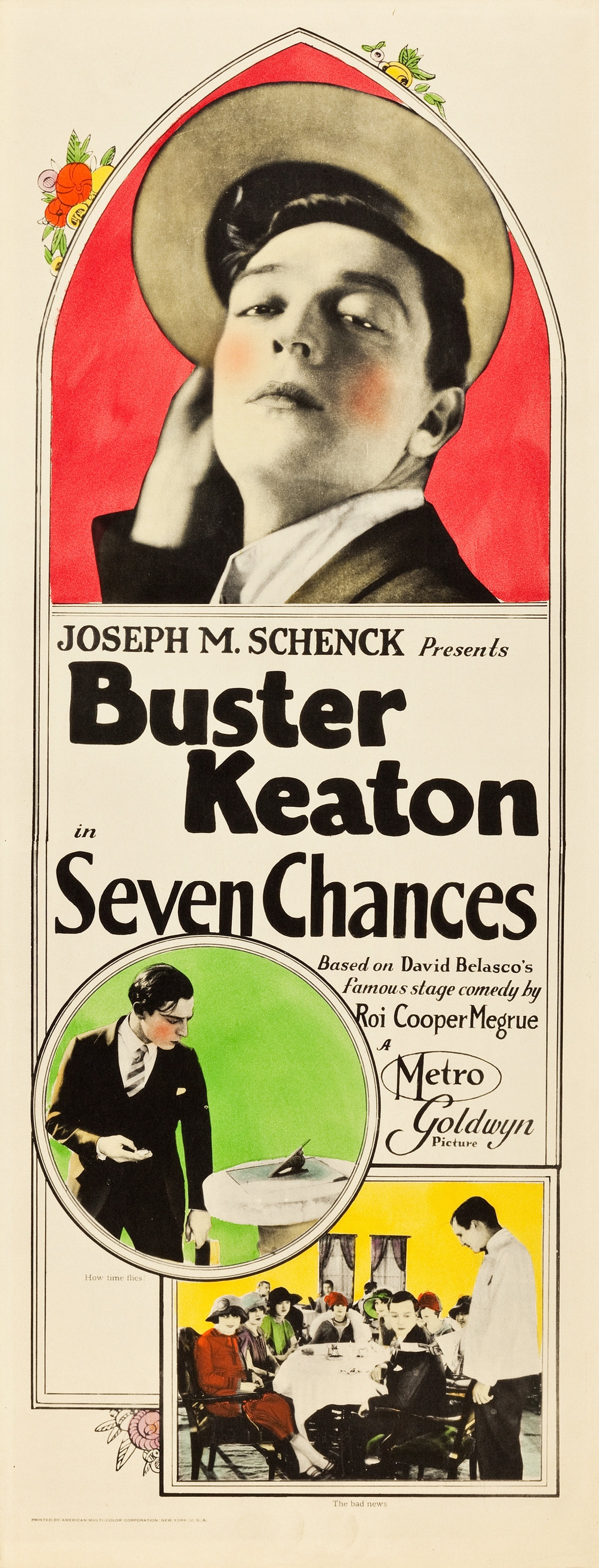
- Theatrical release three-sheet poster
- Directed by: Buster Keaton
- Screenplay by: Clyde Bruckman; Jean Havez; Joseph A. Mitchell
- Story by: David Belasco
- Based on: Seven Chances; 1916 play by Roi Cooper Megrue
- Produced by: Joseph M. Schenck; Buster Keaton
- Starring: Buster Keaton
- Cinematography: Byron Houck; Elgin Lessley
- Edited by: Buster Keaton
- Music by: Robert Israel (1995)
- Distributed by: Metro-Goldwyn
- Release date: March 15, 1925 (United States)
- Running time: 57 minutes (6 reels)
- Country: United States
- Languages: Silent film English intertitles
- Box office: $598,288

Seven Chances is a 1925 American silent comedy film directed by and starring Buster Keaton, based on the play of the same name by Roi Cooper Megrue, produced in 1916 by David Belasco. Additional cast members include T. Roy Barnes, Snitz Edwards, and Ruth Dwyer. Jean Arthur, a future star, has an uncredited supporting role. The film's opening scenes were shot in early Technicolor. The film includes Keaton's famous rock avalanche sequence.

== Plot ==
Seven Chances (1925)

Jimmie Shannon is the junior partner in the brokerage firm of Meekin and Shannon, which is on the brink of financial ruin. A lawyer (whom they dodged, mistakenly believing he was trying to add to their woes) finally manages to inform Jimmie of the terms of his grandfather's will. He will inherit seven million dollars if he is married by 7:00 p.m. on his 27th birthday, which happens to be that same day.

Jimmie immediately seeks out his sweetheart, Mary Jones, who readily accepts his proposal. However, when he clumsily explains why they have to get married that day, she breaks up with him.

He returns to the country club to break the news to his partner and the lawyer. Though Jimmie's heart is set on Mary, Meekin persuades him to try proposing to other women to save them both from ruin or even possibly jail. He has Jimmie look in the club's dining room, Jimmie knows seven women there (the chances of the title). Each turns him down. In desperation, Jimmie asks any woman he comes across. Even the hat check girl rejects him. He finally finds one who agrees, but it turns out she is underage.

Meanwhile, Mary's mother persuades her to reconsider. She writes a note agreeing to marry Jimmie and sends the hired hand to deliver it.

Unaware of this, Meekin has his partner's predicament (and potential inheritance) printed in the newspaper, asking would-be brides to go to the Broad Street Church at 5 p.m. Hordes of veiled women descend on the place. When they spot Jimmie (who had fallen asleep on a pew), they begin to fight over him. Then the clergyman appears and announces he believes it all to be a practical joke. Infuriated, the women chase after Jimmie. While hiding, he gets Mary's note. He races to Mary's house, pursued by furious females. Along the way, he accidentally starts an avalanche, which drives away the mob.

When he gets to Mary's home, Meekin shows him his watch: he is minutes too late. Mary still wants to marry him, money or no, but he refuses to let her share his impending disgrace. When he leaves, he sees by the church clock that Meekin's watch is fast. He and Mary wed just in time.

== Cast ==
- Buster Keaton as James "Jimmie" Shannon
- T. Roy Barnes as His Partner [Billy Meekin]
- Ruth Dwyer as His Sweetheart [Mary Jones]
- Snitz Edwards as His Lawyer
- Frances Raymond as Her Mother
- Jules Cowles (in blackface) as The Hired Hand
- Erwin Connelly as The Clergyman
- Eugenia Gilbert as First Chance
- Doris Deane as Second Chance
- Judy King as Third Chance
- Hazel Deane as Fourth Chance
- Bartine Burkett as Fifth Chance
- Connie Evans as Sixth Chance
- Pauline Toller as Seventh Chance
- Jean Arthur as Miss Smith (uncredited)
- Julian Rivero as Hairdresser (uncredited)
- Rosalind Byrne as Hat Check Girl (uncredited)
- Constance Talmadge as Mother of Baby (uncredited)

== Production ==
Joseph Schenck bought the rights to Roi Cooper Megrue's play Seven Chances thinking it might be a good project for Keaton or for Norma, Constance or Natalie Talmadge. It was an enormous hit on Broadway and touring, and Schenck paid stage director John McDermott $25,000 with the promise he would direct the film. Keaton hated the play and called it a sappy farce, but he owed money to Schenck and had to make the film to settle his debt. But only a week after shooting had begun on September 16, 1924, McDermott withdrew as director telling Keaton, "You are the star and producer, and your version will be the one finally used. You are wasting thousands of dollars having me on the picture." Schenck then agreed to have Keaton make the film instead.

Keaton had intended to finish the film with a fadeout of him still running from the mob of women--500 of them were hired, Keaton claimed—but wished he could think of a better ending. However, the preview audience laughed loudest when Keaton's character accidentally dislodged a rock, which struck two others, sending them tumbling down after the hero. Keaton had 150 papier-mâché and chicken wire fakes made in various sizes, up to 8 feet (2.4 m) in diameter, for what is now considered one of his most memorable sequences. Keaton disliked the film but thought the avalanche scene saved it. Keaton actually saved himself during filming, too, since one of the fake but very heavy boulders briefly pinned him to the ground and caused a painful leg injury.

He cast Doris Deane as one of the "seven chance" fiancées, as a favor to his friend Roscoe "Fatty" Arbuckle (Deane was Arbuckle's fiancée).

Beale's Cut Stagecoach Pass appears in the film.

== Reception ==
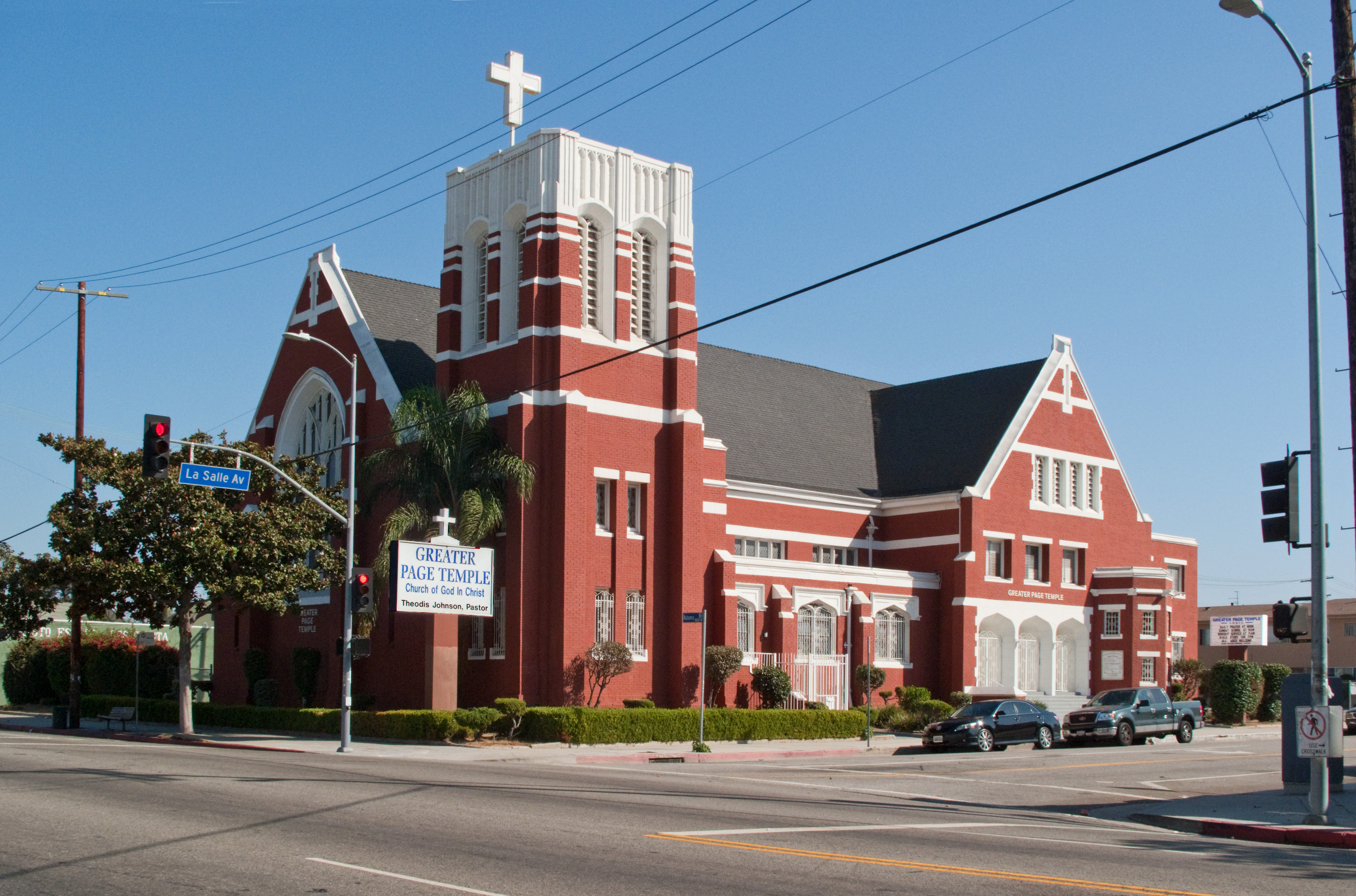
Church in Seven Chances

The film was another box office success for Keaton, grossing $598,288 domestically.

When released, Mordaunt Hall, the film critic for The New York Times, gave the film a mixed review, and wrote, "After viewing Buster Keaton's latest comedy, Seven Chances, one is justified in assuming, that there is a slump in the fun market... It took the combined efforts of three experienced gag men to turn the stage effort into screen material. The result inclines one's belief in the old adage concerning too many cooks, as although there are quite a number of good twists some of them have been produced in haste. The ideas did not have time to ripen and are therefore put before the audience in a rather sour state."

The New York Sun thought the film "a bright, merry, and wholly laughable photoplay....While this movie is not so sidesplittingly funny as...'The Navigator'...it further strengthens the conviction of this department that Mr. Keaton and not Harold Lloyd is runnerup to Charles Spencer Chaplin in the slapstick sweepstakes....[the Belasco play] has been splintered into a rowdy movie....Throughout the course of 'Seven Chances' are expert comic tricks, or 'gags' as they are commonly called. Indeed, the crop is the freshest we have seen since Harold Lloyd's 'Girl Shy.' No amount of comic tricks would be worth a cent, however, without a real comedian, and so Buster Keaton deserves all the eulogy that is to be spilled on 'Seven Chances'."

Film critic Dennis Schwartz liked the film and wrote in 2005, "A less ambitious but, nevertheless, hilarious Buster Keaton comedy. It's taken from the play by David Belasco and scripted by a team of writers. This minor film is based on a one-joke premise, but it has one of the greatest ever chase scenes. Keaton proves he's a master at building the comedy until it reaches its absolute breaking point."

Time Out London gave the film a positive review and wrote in 2008, "Less ambitious and less concerned with plastic values than the best of Keaton, this is nevertheless a dazzlingly balletic comedy in which Buster has a matter of hours to acquire the wife on which a seven million dollar inheritance depends... From this leisurely start, the film takes off into a fantastically elaborate, gloriously inventive chase sequence, in which Buster escapes the mob of pursuing harridans only to find an escalating avalanche of rocks taking over at his heels as he hurtles downhill. Added only after an initial preview, the rocks make for one of the great Keaton action gags."

== Awards ==
Buster Keaton received a Special Mention in 1966 for the British Film Institute's Sutherland Trophy.

== Remakes ==
The story was reworked several times, notably by the Three Stooges in the films Brideless Groom (also written by Clyde Bruckman) and Husbands Beware, in The Suitor (Le Soupirant), a 1962 French comedy starring Pierre Étaix, and in The Bachelor, a 1999 film starring Chris O'Donnell and Renée Zellweger.

The International Buster Keaton Society recreated the Seven Chances "Bridal Run" in the streets of Muskegon, Michigan, at their 2010 convention.

== See also ==
- Buster Keaton filmography
- List of early color feature films
- List of United States comedy films

== Bibliography ==
- Meade, Marion (1997). Buster Keaton: Cut to the Chase (1st ed.). New York: Da Capo Press. ISBN 0306808021.
- Curtis, James (2022). Buster Keaton: A Filmmaker's Life (1st ed.). New York: Alfred A. Knopf. ISBN 9780385354219.
