= Clothes (1914 film) =

1914 film

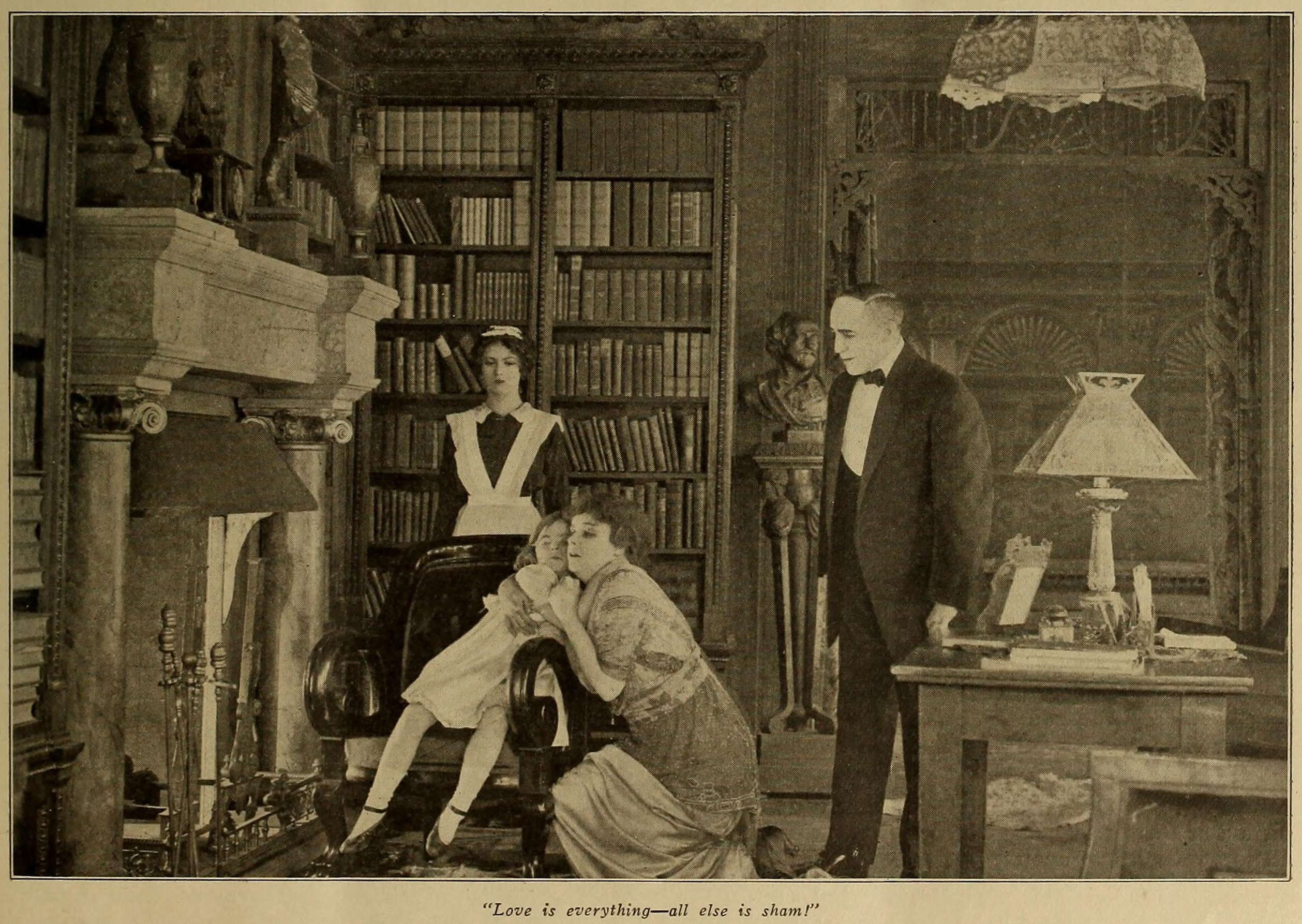
- Charlotte Ives and Mimi Yvonne
- Directed by: Francis Powers
- Based on: play Clothes by Avery Hopwood and Channing Pollock
- Produced by: Daniel Frohman; Adolph Zukor
- Starring: Charlotte Ives; House Peters
- Distributed by: State Rights
- Release date: March 10, 1914
- Running time: 4 reels
- Country: USA
- Language: Silent..English titles

Clothes is a lost 1914 American silent drama film directed by Francis Powers and starring Charlotte Ives and House Peters. It was based on a 1906 play by Avery Hopwood and Channing Pollock.

== Plot ==
According to a film magazine, "Because Olive Sherwood has developed a too great fondness for clothes, her father, afflicted with an illness which shortly ends his life, invests in Red Star Mining stock, hoping that its dividends will provide his daughter with the comforts of life. Arnold West is the exploiter of this stock. He meets Olive and falls in love with her. After her father's death he assures her that the stock will net her a comfortable income and advises her to come to New York and make her home with her cousin, Mrs. Cathcart. The Watlings, former Omaha neighbors of Olive's, have moved to the metropolis and prospered and when Olive takes up her abode with her cousin, she is made a member of the Watling's set. Here she meets Richard Burbank the young millionaire. They have a mutual love for little Ruth Watling and with Mr. Watling are the only happy moments in the life of the little girl, whose mother has heeded the call of "clothes" and neglects her.

West pays Olive supposed dividends and with some of the money settles a gown bill for her, the receipt showing her indebtedness to him. With a new wardrobe, also purchased with this money, she attends a house-party at the Watling's winter home. Burbank proposes and is accepted. Reviewing the happy occurrence, she is startled by West's entering her room and forcing his attentions upon her. Her aunt comes to her rescue. Burbank and Mrs. Watling are summoned and in the presence of the guests West is brought to account. Displaying his check-book with its tell-tale receipt, Olive is put in disgrace and leaves quietly for her old home in Omaha. Watling, ruined through his investments in Red Star mining stock, takes his little family back to Omaha. West's office assistant convinces Burbank that Olive is innocent of any wrong and when Burbank receives a note from Ruth telling him of Olive's presence in Omaha, he goes there and the result is a pretty reconciliation. West, from an over-dose of "dope" meets a sudden death."

== Cast ==
- Charlotte Ives - Olive Sherwood
- House Peters - Arnold West
- Edward MacKay - Richard Burbank
- Frederick Webber - Horace Watling
- Josephine Drake - Anna Watling
- Minna Gale Haynes - Mrs. Cathcart
- Mimi Yvonne - Ruth Watling

== Reception ==
Motion Picture News reviewer Lesley Mason gave the film a positive review, saying of the production "'Clothes' is, as a whole, one of the consistently good things the Famous Players have done."

New York Clipper was quite positive towards the film, describing the production as "top notch" and the film as a whole as "It is a step upward, and distinctly in the right direction." The cast was also praised for their performances, and that they handled their roles "competently."

== Preservation status ==
As with all films produced by Francis Powers before 1921, Clothes is considered to be a lost film.
