= It Pays to Advertise (1931 film) =

1931 film

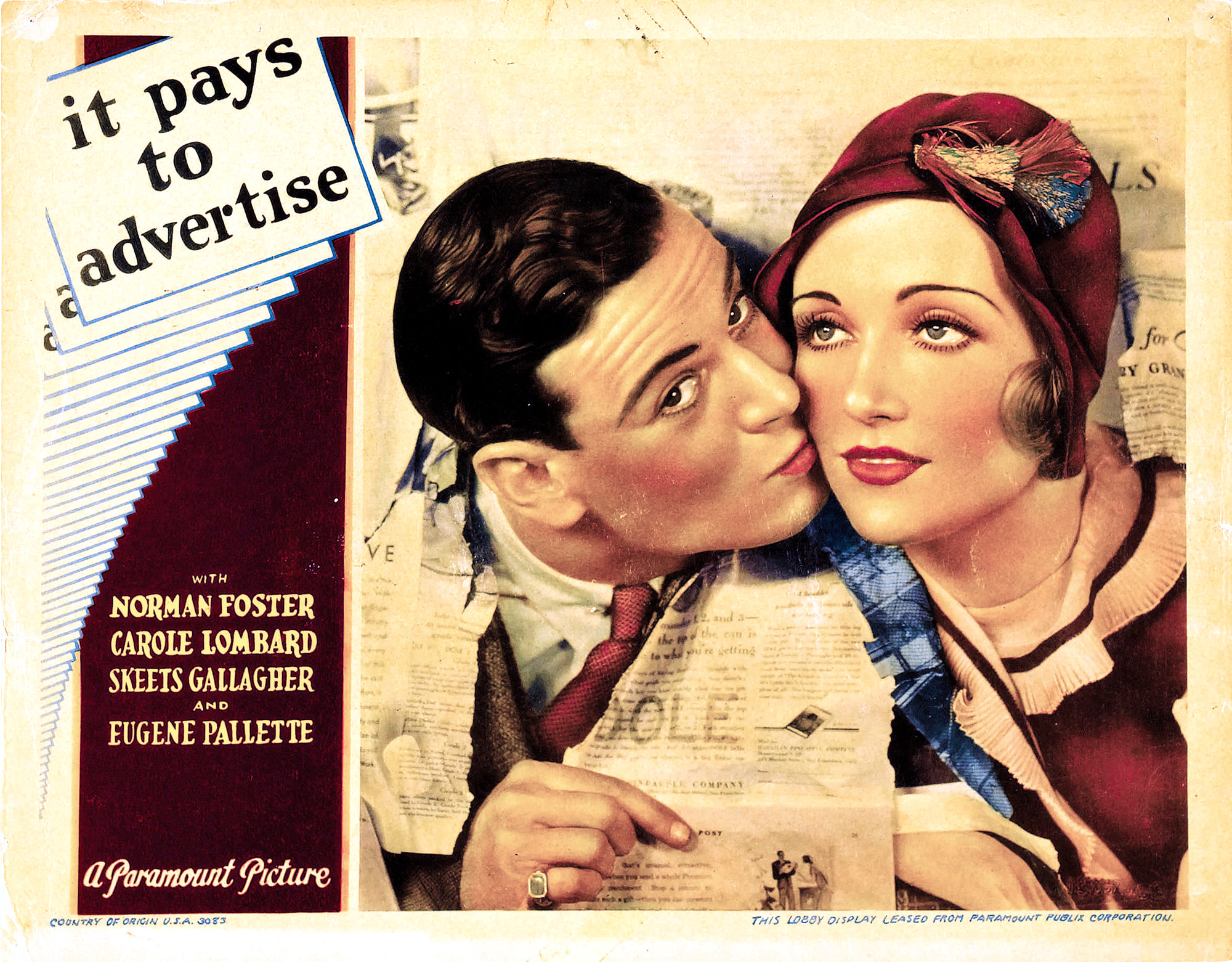
- Lobby card
- Directed by: Frank Tuttle
- Written by: Ethel Doherty; Arthur Kober
- Based on: It Pays to Advertise by Roi Cooper Megrue and Walter Hackett
- Starring: Norman Foster; Carole Lombard
- Cinematography: Archie Stout
- Distributed by: Paramount Pictures
- Release date: February 19, 1931
- Running time: 63 minutes
- Country: United States
- Language: English

It Pays to Advertise is a 1931 American pre-Code comedy film, based on the 1914 Broadway play of the same name by Roi Cooper Megrue and Walter Hackett, starring Norman Foster and Carole Lombard, and directed by Frank Tuttle.

Paramount also produced a French-language version of the film titled Criez-le sur les toits (1932), directed by Karl Anton.

== Plot ==
Rodney Martin sets up a soap business to rival his father. With the help of an advertising expert and his secretary, Mary, he develops a successful marketing campaign. His father ends up buying the company from him, while Rodney and Mary fall in love.

== Cast ==
- Norman Foster as Rodney Martin
- Carole Lombard as Mary Grayson
- Richard 'Skeets' Gallagher as Ambrose Pearle
- Eugene Pallette as Cyrus Martin
- Lucien Littlefield as Adams
- Judith Wood as Countess de Beaurien (credited as Helen Johnson)
- Louise Brooks as Thelma Temple
- Morgan Wallace as L. R. McChesney
- Tom Kennedy as Perkins
- Marcia Manners as Miss Burke
- Frank Coghlan Jr. as Office Boy (credited as Junior Coghlan)
- John Howell as Johnson
- John Sinclair as Window Cleaner
- Mischa Auer as Man Putting Sign on Car

== Reception ==
The film received positive reviews. Photoplay wrote that it has "plenty of speed and lots of laughs", and praised the "perfect cast".

== See also ==
- It Pays to Advertise (1919)
- It Pays to Advertise (1936)
