= Roi Cooper Megrue =

American writer

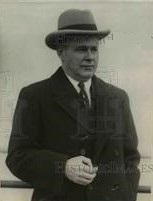
Roi Cooper Megrue

Roi Cooper Megrue (June 12, 1882 – February 27, 1927) was an American playwright, producer, and director active on Broadway from 1914 to 1921.

== Biography ==
Roi Cooper Megrue was born on June 12, 1882, in New York City, the son of the son of Frank Newton Megrue, a stockbroker, and Stella Georgiana Cooper.

He attended Trinity School (New York City) and graduated (A.B.) in 1903 from Columbia University, where he engaged in college theatricals. He wrote the libretto for The Isle of Illusia, an all-male operetta that included a caricature of Clyde Fitch, of whom Megrue became a close friend.

At Columbia he met, and became a friend, of future Broadway actor Ralph Morgan.

Cooper worked with Elisabeth Marbury as a play broker before starting his career as playwright. He had a key role in the Dramatists Guild.

He never married and died on February 27, 1927, in New York City. According to the obituary on Variety, his "affectionate relationship with his mother was epic" and they shared an artistically furnished apartment. He is buried at Woodlawn Cemetery (Bronx, New York) with his mother.

Columbia College awards the Roi Cooper Megrue Scholarship annually to a self-supporting student.

== Career ==
The 1912 play White Magic was written by Roi Cooper Megrue and David Graham Phillips and produced Liebler & Co. It opened at the Criterion Theatre on 24 January 1912. It closed after 21 performances, in February 1912. It starred Florence Brian, Ruth Chester, Charles Dowd, Gertrude Elliott, Ben Johnson, George Le Guere, Julian L'Estrange, Suzanne Perry, Alexander Scott-Gatty, and Suzanne Sheldon.

Megrue wrote An Unlucky Star (1-act) in 1912; in 1913 his play The Neglected Lady was produced on Broadway. The 1914 farce It Pays to Advertise was written by Megrue and Walter Hackett. It opened at the Cohan Theatre on 8 September 1914 and ran for nearly a year. It opened at the Bronx Opera House on 20 September 1915, produced by Cohan & Harris. The playwrights substantially rewrote the play for a new production in London by the actor-manager Tom Walls, at the Aldwych Theatre. It opened on 2 February 1924 and closed on 10 July 1925, after a total of 598 performances. The 1919 (now lost) silent drama movie It Pays to Advertise was directed by Donald Crisp and written by Elmer Blaney Harris. The film stars Bryant Washburn, Lois Wilson, Frank Currier, Walter Hiers, Clarence Geldart, and Julia Faye. The film was released on November 23, 1919, by Paramount Pictures. It was remade in 1931 starring Norman Foster and Carole Lombard, and directed by Frank Tuttle.

The 1915 play Under Cover was written by Roi Cooper Megrue and produced by Selwyn & Co. It opened at the Cort Theatre on 26 August 1914 directed by Roi Cooper Megrue and closed in June 1915 after 349 performances. It starred Lily Cahill, William Courtenay, Harry Crosby, Wilfred Draycott, Lola Fisher, Phoebe Foster, DeWitt Jennings, John May, Ralph Morgan, Rae Selwyn, George Stevens, Lucile Watson, Jay Wilson. It opened at the Bronx Opera House on 27 September 1915. The 1916 (now lost) silent drama movie Under Cover was directed by Robert G. Vignola and written by Doty Hobart and Roi Cooper Megrue. The film stars Hazel Dawn, Owen Moore, William Courtleigh Jr., Ethel Fleming, Frank Losee, and Ida Darling. The film was released on July 20, 1916, by Paramount Pictures.

The 1915 play Abe and Mawruss (or Potash and Perlmutter in Society) was written by Roi Cooper Megrue and Montague Glass and produced by Albert H. Woods. It opened at the Lyric Theatre on 21 October 1915 and closed in April 1916.

The 1915 play Under Fire was written by Roi Cooper Megrue and produced by Selwyn & Co. It opened at the Hudson Theatre on 11 September 1915 co-directed by William Courtenay and Roi Cooper Megrue and closed in January 1916 after 129 performances. It starred Dorothy Abbott, Sydney Chon, William Courtenay, Frank Craven, Robert Fischer, Phoebe Foster, Violet Heming, Edward Hicks, Felix Krembs, Frank Morgan, McKay Morris, Edward G. Robinson, Malise Sheridan, Henry Stephenson, Norman Tharp, Harland Tucker, Jack Wessel.

The 1916 play Seven Chances was written by Roi Cooper Megrue and produced by David Belasco. It opened at the George M. Cohan's Theatre on 8 August 1916. It moved to the Belasco Theatre on 23 October 1916 and closed in December 1916 after 151 performances. It starred Marion Abbott, Charles Brokate, Emily Callaway, Alice Carroll, Frank Craven, Florence Deshon, Hayward Ginn, Otto Kruger, Rowland V. Lee, Harry Leighton, Helen MacKellar, Carroll McComas, Anne Meredith, Lillian Spencer, Allen Thomas, Beverly West. It was adapted for the screen in 1925 as Seven Chances and again in 1999 as The Bachelor. The 1925 silent comedy movie Seven Chances was directed by and starring Buster Keaton, who was supported by T. Roy Barnes, Snitz Edwards and Ruth Dwyer. Jean Arthur, a future star, has an uncredited supporting role. The 1999 romantic comedy movie The Bachelor was directed by Gary Sinyor and written by Steve Cohen. It stars Chris O'Donnell and Renée Zellweger, and was also the debut of Mariah Carey as an actress.

The 1916 play Under Sentence was written by Roi Cooper Megrue and Irvin S. Cobb and produced by Selwyn & Co. It opened at the Harris Theatre on October 3, 1916, directed by Roi Cooper Megrue and closed in November 1916 after 55 performances. It starred Janet Beecher, John A. Boone, Harry Crosby, Stephen Denbeigh, E.H. Dresser, Laurence Eddinger, Thomas P. Gunn, Felix Krembs, George MacQuarrie, Thomas Mitchell, Frank Morgan, George Nash, Edward G. Robinson, Joseph Slaytor, Gerald Oliver Smith, George Wright Jr. The 1917 silent drama Fighting Odds was based upon Under Sentence and was both produced and distributed by Goldwyn Pictures, directed by Allan Dwan and starring Maxine Elliott. The film survives, minus one reel, at the Museum of Modern Art, New York, and Gosfilmofond in Russia.

The 1917 play Why Marry? was written by Jesse Lynch Williams. It won the first Pulitzer Prize for Drama, in 1918. It opened at the Astor Theatre on December 25, 1917, directed by Roi Cooper Megrue and produced by Selwyn & Co. in arrangement with Roi Cooper Megrue. It closed in April 1918 after 120 performances. It starred Beatrice Beckley, Edmund Breese, Walter Goodson, Nat C. Goodwin, Shelly Hull, Ernest Lawford, Richard Pitman, Lotus Robb, Harold West, Estelle Winwood.

The 1918 play Where Poppies Bloom was adapted from Henry Kistemaeckers' Un Soir, au Front by Roi Cooper Megrue and produced by Albert H. Woods. It opened at the Theatre Republic on August 26, 1918, directed by Roi Cooper Megrue and closed in November 1918 after 104 performances. It starred Pedro de Cordoba, Will Deming, Paul Doucet, Laurence Eddinger, Jean Gautier, Alfred Hesse, Percival Knight, Frank Nelson, Marjorie Rambeau, Marcel Rousseau, Lewis Stone, Roy Walling.

The 1918 play Tea for Three was directed by Roi Cooper Megrue. The 1927 (now lost) silent comedy movie Tea for Three was directed by Robert Z. Leonard and written by Garrett Graham, F. Hugh Herbert, Roi Cooper Megrue and Lucille Newmark. The film stars Lew Cody, Aileen Pringle, Owen Moore, Phillips Smalley, Dorothy Sebastian and Edward Thomas. The film was released on October 29, 1927, by Metro-Goldwyn-Mayer.

The 1921 comedy Honors Are Even was written by Roi Cooper Megrue and produced by Selwyn & Co. It opened at the Times Square Theatre on August 10, 1921, directed by Roi Cooper Megrue and closed in October of the same year after 70 performances. It starred William Courtenay, Clifford Dempsey, Lola Fisher, Paul Kelly, Ambrose Martin, Henry Mowray, Horace Pollock, Laurence Redmond, Ralph Simone, Horace Sinclair, Mabel Stanton, Eleanor Woodruff, Boots Wooster. The play was Megrue's final Broadway credit; it was not well received by Dorothy Parker: "You couldn't find a sweeter, cleaner, more wholesome little comedy....nor a duller one."

The 1925 play Venice for Two (from the French of Sacha Guitry) was written by Roi Cooper Megrue. It was his last work.
