= It Pays to Advertise (1919 film) =

1919 film by Donald Crisp

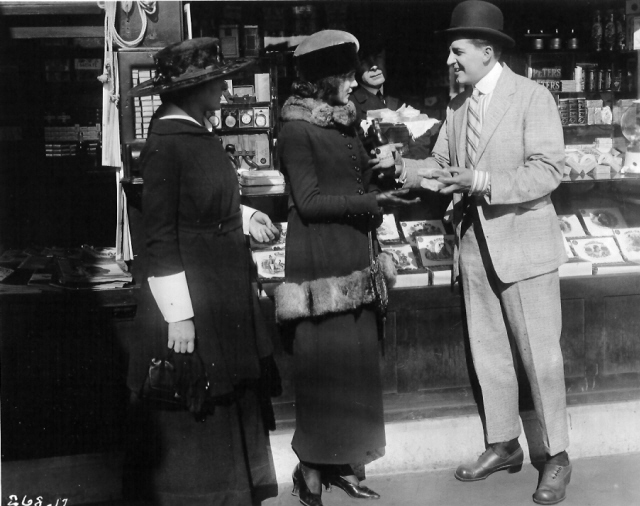
- Lois Wilson (center) and Bryant Washburn in It Pays to Advertise
- Directed by: Donald Crisp
- Screenplay by: Elmer Blaney Harris
- Based on: It Pays to Advertise by Roi Cooper Megrue and Walter Hackett
- Produced by: Jesse L. Lasky
- Starring: Bryant Washburn; Lois Wilson; Frank Currier; Walter Hiers; Clarence Geldart; Julia Faye
- Cinematography: Charles Edgar Schoenbaum
- Production company: Famous Players–Lasky Corporation
- Distributed by: Paramount Pictures
- Release date: November 23, 1919
- Running time: 50 minutes
- Country: United States
- Language: Silent (English intertitles)

It Pays to Advertise is a 1919 American silent drama film directed by Donald Crisp and written by Elmer Blaney Harris based upon the 1914 Broadway play of the same name by Roi Cooper Megrue and Walter Hackett. The film stars Bryant Washburn, Lois Wilson, Frank Currier, Walter Hiers, Clarence Geldart, and Julia Faye. The film was released on November 23, 1919, by Paramount Pictures. It is not known whether the film currently survives, and it may be a lost film.

The film was remade in 1931.

== Plot ==
As described in a film magazine, Rodney Martin graduates from college with a splendid education and is surprised to find himself absolutely unprepared for a business career. However, business strangely attracts him, possible because of Mary Grayson, his father's secretary, whom he thinks is the most proper thing in women. Since she is a businesswoman, he reasons that he must prove himself a business man. He decks out an office before he decides what line of business he will follow. A friend suggests the soap business. He straight away begins an advertising campaign that works wonders. However, the bills, when they arrive, overcome him and he faces disaster. His father comes to the rescue by appointing him as an advertising man in his organization, so all ends as it should.

== Cast ==
- Bryant Washburn as Rodney Martin
- Lois Wilson as Mary Grayson
- Frank Currier as Cyrus Martin
- Walter Hiers as Ambrose Peale
- Clarence Geldart as House Manager
- Julia Faye as Countess de Beaurien
- Guy Oliver as McChesney
