= Alexander Carr =

American actor

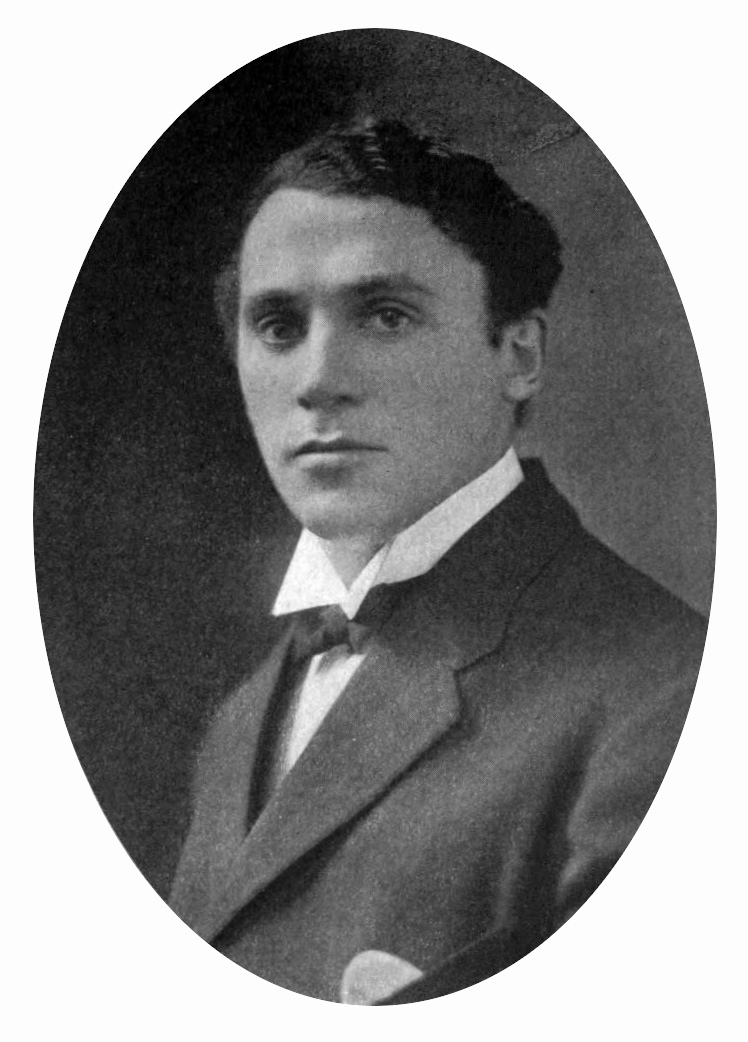
- Born: Alexander Carr; March 7, 1878; Romny, Russian Empire
- Died: September 19, 1946 (aged 68); Los Angeles, California
- Resting place: Hollywood Forever Cemetery, Hollywood California (Los Angeles County)
- Occupations: actor writer
- Years active: 1907-1940
- Spouses: Helen Ryan Cressman; Helen Cunningham; Mary Carr
- Relatives: Nat Carr (brother)

Alexander Carr (1878–1946) was a Russian born stage and screen actor, writer, vaudevillian, burlesque and circus performer.

== Biography ==
He made his first stage appearance on stage at a music hall in St. Paul, Minnesota. He appeared later in theatres in Louisville, Nashville and Buffalo. In Chicago he appeared at the Trocadero theatre. His first New York appearance was in 1904 at the Circle Theatre in "Wine, Women and Song" imitating David Warfield. In 1907 he costarred with Jefferson De Angelis and Blanche Ring in the musical The Gay White Way on Broadway. He established an on stage partnership with friend Barney Bernard. Beginning in 1913 the two appeared in the long running ethnic Jewish play Potatsh and Perlmutter, one of the most successful plays of the early twentieth century Broadway. Carr played the part of Morris (*or ethnically Mawlruss) Perlmutter. The play was adapted to a silent film in 1923 and a sequel a year later after Bernard died. In addition to the Potash' movies, Carr appeared in silent film sporadically. In sound films his presence is more frequent and finished his last movie in 1940.

His younger brother was Nat Carr.

Carr died in Los Angeles in 1946.

== Filmography ==
- Potash and Perlmutter (1923)
- In Hollywood with Potash and Perlmutter (1924)
- Partners Again (1926)
- The Beautiful Cheat (1926)
- April Fool (1926)
- The End of the World (1929)(*short)
- No Greater Love (1932)
- Uptown New York (1932)
- The Death Kiss (1932)
- Hypnotized (1932)
- Her Splendid Folly (1933)
- The Constant Woman (1933)
- Out All Night (1933)
- I Hate Women (1934)
- Hide-Out (1934)(*uncredited)
- Christmas in July (1940)
