= In Hollywood with Potash and Perlmutter =

1924 film by Alfred E. Green

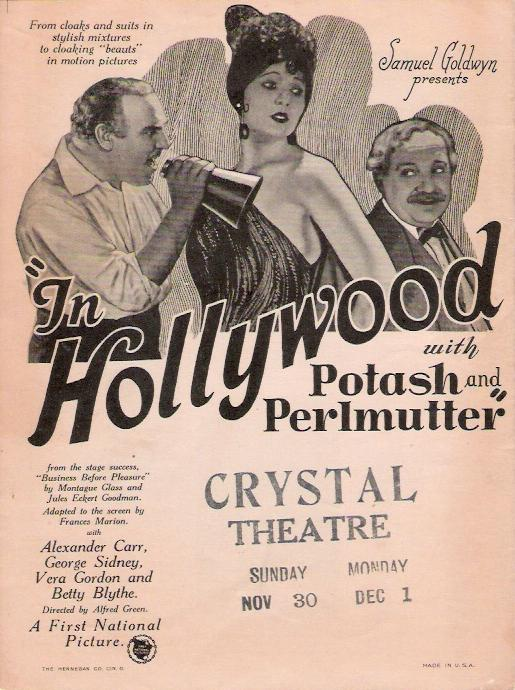
- Directed by: Alfred E. Green
- Written by: Frances Marion; Montague Glass (play Potash and Perlmutter and Business Before Pleasure); Charles Klein (play Potash and Perlmutter); Jules Eckert Goodman (play Business Before Pleasure); Montague Glass (titles)
- Produced by: Samuel Goldwyn
- Cinematography: Arthur C. Miller; Harry Hallenberger
- Edited by: Stuart Heisler
- Production company: Samuel Goldwyn Productions
- Distributed by: Associated First National
- Release date: September 29, 1924
- Running time: 70 minutes
- Country: United States
- Language: English

In Hollywood with Potash and Perlmutter is a 1924 American silent comedy film, produced by Samuel Goldwyn, released through Associated First National Pictures, and directed by Alfred E. Green.

A sequel of sorts, the Jewish ethnic comedy characters of Potash and Perlmutter return from their 1923 debut film, also produced by Goldwyn, but with a different actor for Potash. The films were based on Potash and Perlmutter a play by Charles Klein and Montague Glass which opened on Broadway in 1913 and ran for 441 performances. This sequel also adapted the play Business Before Pleasure by Montague Glass and Jules Eckert Goodman which opened in 1917 for 357 performances.

Alexander Carr returned for his role as Perlmutter but his longtime partner from the Broadway plays and the 1923 movie, Barney Bernard, died in March 1924, before this film got underway. Bernard was only 45 but always looked considerably older than he was. George Sidney, soon to be famous in another Jewish series The Cohens & the Kellys, picks up the part of Potash where Barney Bernard left off.

They would return again in 1926 in Partners Again (1926). Goldwyn had evidently been familiar with this series of Jewish-themed stories, written by Montague Glass and mounted as a Broadway play in 1913, back when he was a glove salesman, and produced these film versions over the objections of the other Jewish moguls of Hollywood.

== Cast ==
- Alexander Carr as Morris Perlmutter (*or Mawlruss Perlmutter)
- George Sidney as Abe Potash
- Vera Gordon as Rosie Potash
- Betty Blythe as Rita Sismondi
- Belle Bennett as Mrs. Perlmutter
- Anders Randolf as Blanchard
- Peggy Shaw as Irma Potash
- Charles Meredith as Sam Pemberton
- Lillian Hackett as Miss O'Ryan
- David Butler as Crabbe
- Sidney Franklin as Film Buyer
- Joseph W. Girard as Film Buyer
- Louis Payne as Banker
- Cyril Ring as Partington
- Norma Talmadge as herself
- Constance Talmadge as herself

== Preservation ==
With no prints of In Hollywood with Potash and Perlmutter located in any film archives, it is considered a lost film.
