= Barney Bernard =

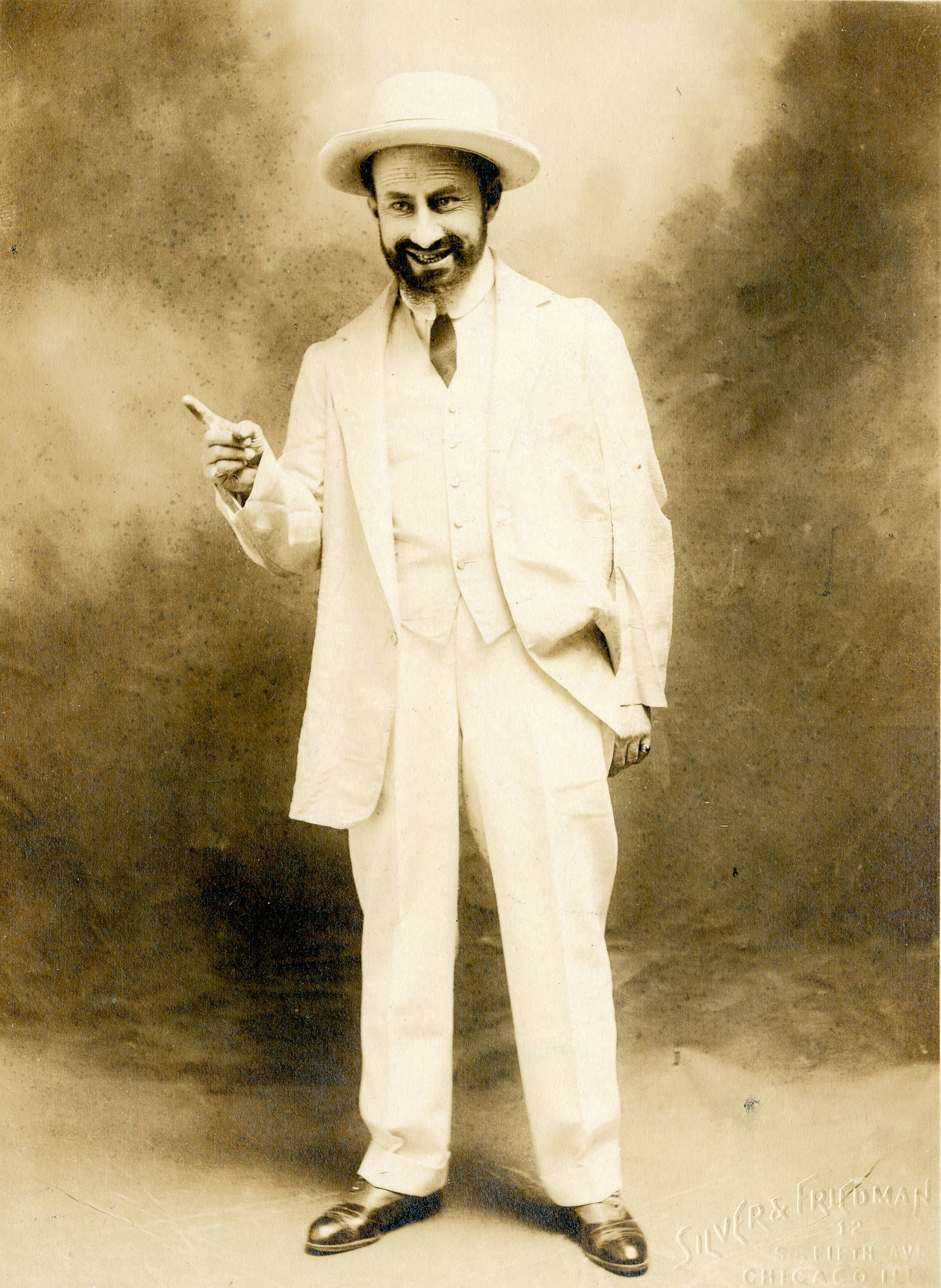
- Born: August 18, 1877; Rochester, New York
- Died: March 21, 1924 (aged 46); New York, New York
- Resting place: Washington Cemetery, Brooklyn, New York
- Occupation: actor
- Years active: ?-1924
- Spouse: Rose Francis

Barney Bernard (August 18, 1877 – March 21, 1924) was an American stage and screen actor. Bernard always looked older than he was which allowed him to play aging ethnic Jewish characters. He established an onstage partnership with Alexander Carr and the two starred in the successful play Potash and Perlmutter beginning in 1913. Prior to the 'Potash' success, Bernard was in the first Ziegfeld Follie revue, Ziegfeld Follies of 1908 and had also appeared in a few stage musicals with Al Jolson, La Belle Paree (1911) with Kitty Gordon, Vera Violetta (1911) with Gaby Deslys, The Whirl of Society (1912) with José Collins.

Bernard died in March 1924 while preparing to costar with Carr in the sequel to their film version of Potash and Perlmutter (1923) to be called In Hollywood with Potash and Perlmutter. Actor George Sidney was brought in to replace Bernard as Abe Potash.

== Filmography ==
- Intolerance (1916)(*uncredited)
- Phantom Fortunes (1916)
- A Prince in a Pawnshop (1916)
- Potash and Perlmutter (1923)

== See also ==
- Gallagher and Shean
