= The Cohens and Kellys in Africa =

1930 film

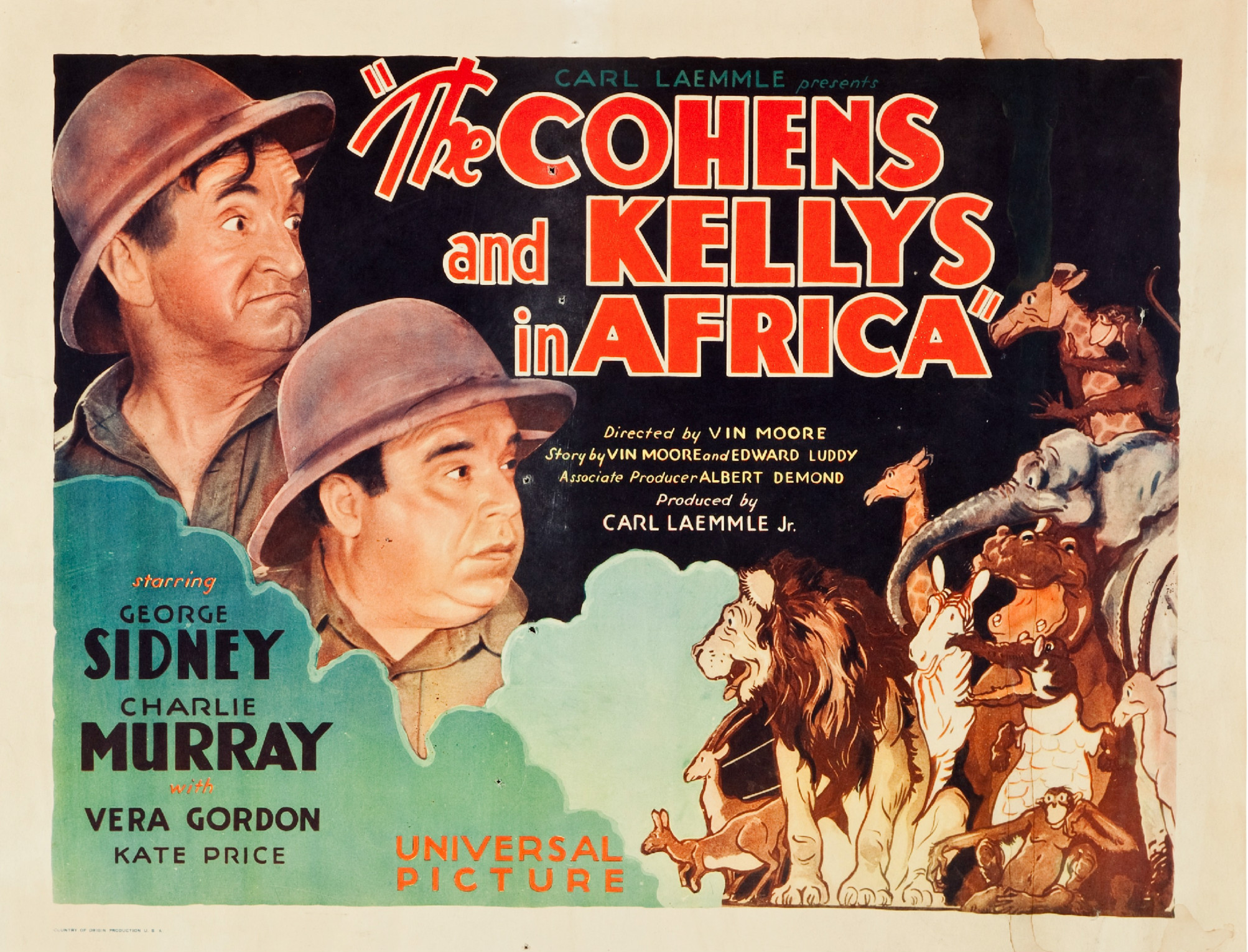
- Lobby card
- Directed by: Vin Moore
- Written by: Edward Luddy; Lew Lipton; Vin Moore
- Produced by: Albert DeMond; Carl Laemmle Jr.
- Starring: George Sidney; Charles Murray; Vera Gordon
- Cinematography: Hal Mohr
- Edited by: James B. Morley; Maurice Pivar
- Music by: Cecil Arnold (non-dialogue version; uncredited); James Dietrich (non-dialogue version; uncredited); Sam Perry (non-dialogue version; uncredited); Heinz Roemheld (uncredited)
- Production company: Universal Pictures
- Distributed by: Universal Pictures
- Release date: December 20, 1930
- Running time: 70 minutes
- Country: United States

The Cohens and Kellys in Africa is a 1930 American pre-Code comedy film directed by Vin Moore and starring George Sidney, Charles Murray, and Vera Gordon. It is the fifth installment of The Cohens and Kellys series.

== Plot ==
Cohen and Kelly go on an expedition in search of affordable ivory for making piano keys. Their adventure includes facing vicious animals, cannibals, and other dangers. They end up sealing a deal by playing miniature golf with a native of Africa.

== Cast ==
- George Sidney as Cohen
- Charles Murray as Kelly
- Vera Gordon as Mrs. Cohen
- Kate Price as Mrs. Kelly
- Lloyd Whitlock as Sheik
- Nick Cogley as Guide
- Eddie Kane as Chief Zulu
- Demetrius Alexis as Sheik's Aide
- Rene Marvelle as Dancing Girl
- Georgette Rhodes as Dancing Girl
- Louis John Bartels (uncredited)
- Richard Bishop (uncredited)
- Charles Gemora as Gorilla (uncredited)
- Blue Washington as Native Golf Champion (uncredited)
