= The Cohens and the Kellys in Paris =

1928 film

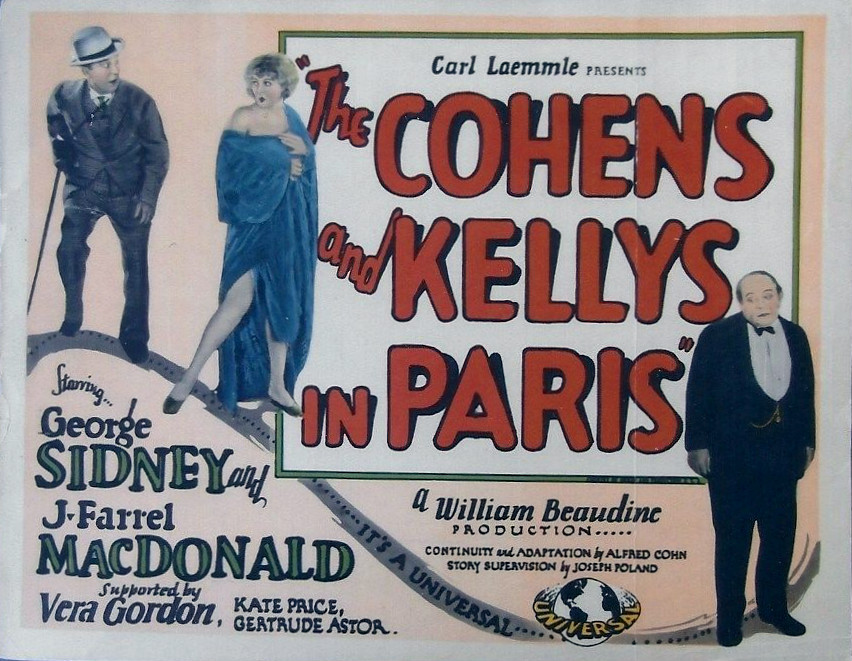
- Lobby card
- Directed by: William Beaudine
- Written by: Alfred A. Cohn (screenplay); Albert DeMond (titles); Jack Mintz
- Produced by: Edward Small
- Starring: George Sidney; J. Farrell MacDonald; Vera Gordon
- Cinematography: Charles J. Stumar
- Edited by: Frank Atkinson; Robert Carlisle
- Distributed by: Universal Pictures
- Release date: January 15, 1928
- Running time: 8 reels
- Country: United States
- Language: Silent (English intertitles)

The Cohens and the Kellys in Paris is a 1928 American silent comedy film directed by William Beaudine. It was the first sequel to The Cohens and Kellys. The film title is sometimes listed as The Cohens and Kellys in Paris.

It was an early production of Edward Small.

== Cast ==
- George Sidney as Sidney Cohen
- J. Farrell MacDonald as Patrick Kelly
- Vera Gordon as Mrs. Cohen
- Kate Price as Mrs. Kelly
- Charles Delaney as Patrick Kelly Jr.
- Sue Carol as Sadye Cohen
- Gertrude Astor as Paulette
- Gino Corrado as Pierre
- Charles Murray (Undetermined Secondary Role)

== Preservation ==
The film is preserved in the Library of Congress collection Packard Campus for Audio-Visual Conservation and the Cineteca Nazionale, Rome.

== See also ==
- Gertrude Astor filmography
