= Flying Romeos =

1928 film

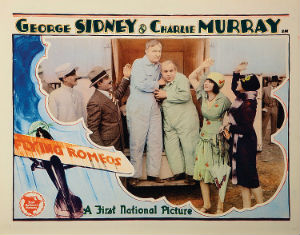
- Lobby card
- Directed by: Mervyn LeRoy
- Screenplay by: John McDermott; Sidney Lazarus; Gene Towne; John W. Conway
- Starring: Charles Murray; George Sidney; Fritzi Ridgeway; Lester Bernard; Duke Martin
- Cinematography: Devereaux Jennings
- Edited by: Paul Weatherwax
- Production company: First National Pictures
- Distributed by: First National Pictures
- Release date: February 26, 1928
- Running time: 60 minutes
- Country: United States
- Language: English

Flying Romeos is a 1928 American comedy adventure directed by Mervyn LeRoy and written by John McDermott, Sidney Lazarus, Gene Towne, and John W. Conway. The film stars the comedy team of Charles Murray and George Sidney, stars of Universal's popular "The Cohens and Kellys" comedies, moonlighting at First National Pictures. Other sidekicks included Fritzi Ridgeway, Lester Bernard, Duke Martin, James Bradbury Jr., and Belle Mitchell. Flying Romeos was released on February 26, 1928, by First National Pictures, typically a B movie studio.

== Plot ==
Barbers Cohen and Cohan both love Minnie, their young manicurist, who has a fondness for aviators. Duly, the pair of hapless middle-aged lovers sign up for flying lessons and accidentally find themselves performing some wild stunts in an aircraft.

The owner of the "Spirit of Goldberg" is impressed with the skills of these two tyros. He persuades the duo to make a long ocean flight. The flight leads to more aerial mayhem, especially when the "real" pilot turns out to be a lunatic. On their triumphant return, Cohen and Cohan sadly find their manicurist had married a pilot.

== Cast ==
- Charles Murray as Cohan
- George Sidney as Cohen
- Fritzi Ridgeway as Minnie
- Lester Bernard as Goldberg
- Duke Martin as The Aviator
- James Bradbury Jr. as The Nut
- Belle Mitchell as Mrs. Goldberg

== Production ==
Aviation film historian Stephen Pendo, in Aviation in the Cinema (1985) characterized The Flying Romeos as an early "talkie" that was a comedy vehicle for two noted film comedians with a heavy reliance on slapstick aerial antics. (Note: The Flying Romeos was one of a number of films that were highly influenced by the worldwide publicity generated by the 1927 transatlantic flight by Charles Lindbergh.)

== Reception ==
The contemporary film review of The Flying Romeos by Mordaunt Hall in The New York Times, noted, "The fun in this piece really starts when Messrs. Cohen and Cohan are tested for the air flights across the Pacific. ... The other truly laughable episode is where the friendly enemies are once more up in the air, the machine being steered by a man who happens to have spent the latter part of his life in a lunatic asylum."

Aviation film historian James M. Farmer in Celluloid Wings: The Impact of Movies on Aviation (1984), had a similar reaction, saying that Flying Romeos "... provides an excellent series of opportunities for some outrageous aerial thrills."
