= Vera Gordon =

Russian-American actress (1886-1948)

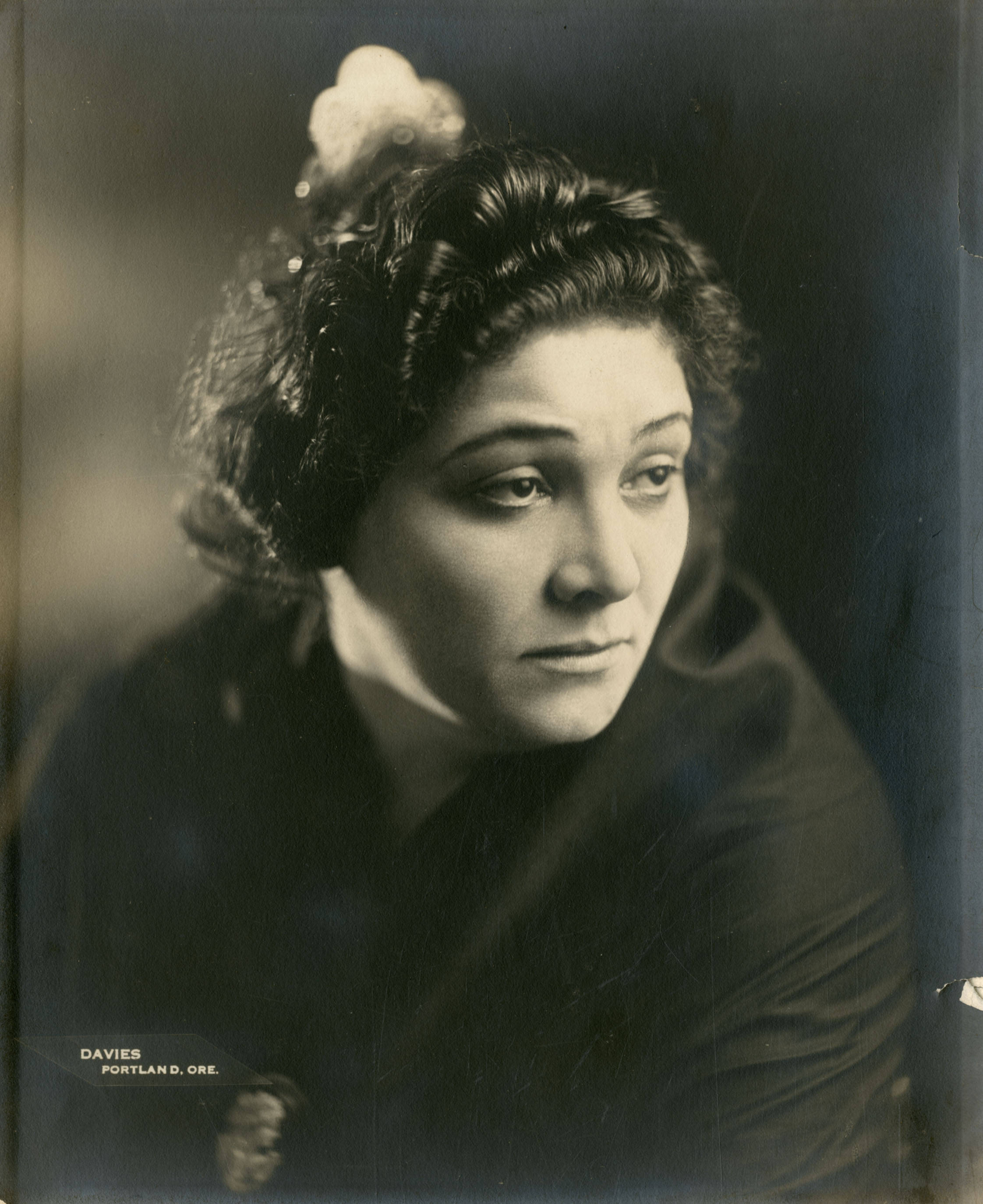
- Gordon in 1909
- Born: Vera Pogorelsky; June 11, 1886; Ekaterinoslav, Russia (now Dnipro, Ukraine)
- Died: May 8, 1948 (aged 61); Beverly Hills, California, U.S.
- Resting place: Hollywood Forever Cemetery, Los Angeles, California, U.S.
- Occupation: Actress
- Years active: 1904–1946
- Spouse: Nathan Gordon (m. 1904)
- Children: 2

Vera Pogorelsky Gordon (June 11, 1886 – May 8, 1948) was a Ukrainian-born American stage and screen actress.

== Early life ==
Vera Pogorelsky was born in Ekaterinoslav (present-day Dnipro), Ukraine, on June 11, 1886, the daughter of Boris Pogorelsky and Teigan Nemirovsky.

== Career ==
Pogorelsky was a child actor but she was fired by the directors of the Shevchenko Imperial Company when they learned she was of Jewish heritage. After emigrating to the United States, Pogorelsky, now Gordon, appeared in smaller theater like the Liberty and the Lyric in New York’s Lower East Side.

In 1916 Gordon went on a tour in England, appearing in vaudeville and theatre.

Gordon starred in several motion pictures such as Humoresque and The Cohens and Kellys. She represented the archetypical Jewish mother.

She contributed to newspapers and magazines on marriage and children, and supported Jewish children orphanages.

She was a member of Actors' Equity Association, Russian-American Art Club of Los Angeles, and Grand Street Boys, N.Y.

== Personal life ==
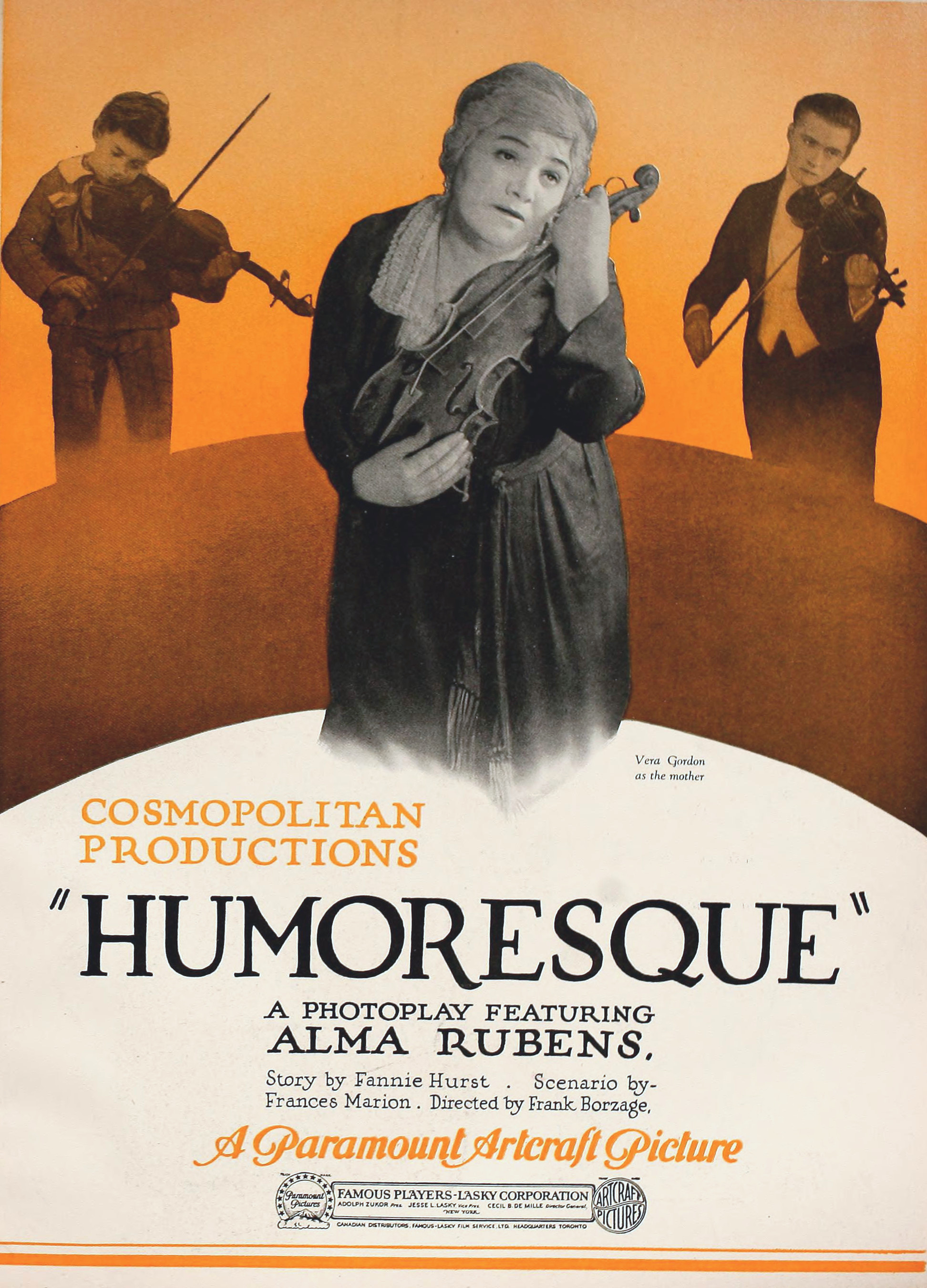
Vera Gordon, Humoresque (1920)

In 1904, in Russia, Vera Pogorelsky married Nathan A. Gordon, a producer and writer at the Ostoffersk Acting Company, and had two children: William (b. 1904) and Nadje (b. 1907).

In 1905 the Gordons moved to New York City and in 1926 to California, living at 364 S. Highland Ave., Los Angeles.

Her nephew was the musicologist and violinist Sol Babitz, and her great-niece was the writer Eve Babitz.

She moved to Beverly Hills, died there on May 8, 1948, and is buried at Hollywood Forever Cemetery, Hollywood.

== Filmography ==
- 1920 Humoresque (Mama Kantor)
- 1920 The North Wind's Malice (Rachel Guth)
- 1920 The Greatest Love (Mrs. Lantini)
- 1922 Your Best Friend (Mrs. Esther Meyers)
- 1922 The Good Provider (Becky Binswanger)
- 1923 Potash and Perlmutter (Rosie Potash)
- 1924 In Hollywood with Potash and Perlmutter (Rosie Potash)
- 1926 The Cohens and Kellys (Mrs. Cohen)
- 1926 Sweet Daddies (Rose Finklebaum)
- 1926 Kosher Kitty Kelly (Mrs. Feinbaum)
- 1926 Millionaires (Esther Rubens)
- 1926 Private Izzy Murphy (Sara Goldberg)
- 1927 An Affair of the Follies
- 1928 The Cohens and the Kellys in Paris (Mrs. Cohen)
- 1928 Four Walls (Benny's Mother)
- 1929 The Cohens and Kellys in Atlantic City (Melitta Cohen)
- 1930 The Cohens and the Kellys in Scotland (Mrs. Cohen)
- 1930 Madame Satan (uncredited)
- 1930 The Cohens and Kellys in Africa (Mrs. Cohen)
- 1931 50 Million Frenchmen (Jewish Tourist's Wife)
- 1934 When Strangers Meet (Mrs. Sarah Rosinsky)
- 1937 Michael O'Halloran (Mrs. Levinsky)
- 1938 You and Me (Mrs. Abie Levine a.k.a. Mama)
- 1938 Having Wonderful Time (Tenement Neighbor (uncredited))
- 1942 The Big Street (Mrs. Lefkowitz)
- 1942 The Living Ghost (Sister Lapidus)
- 1943 Stage Door Canteen (Vera Gordon)
- 1946 Abie's Irish Rose (Mrs. Cohen)
