= The Cohens and Kellys in Trouble =

1933 film

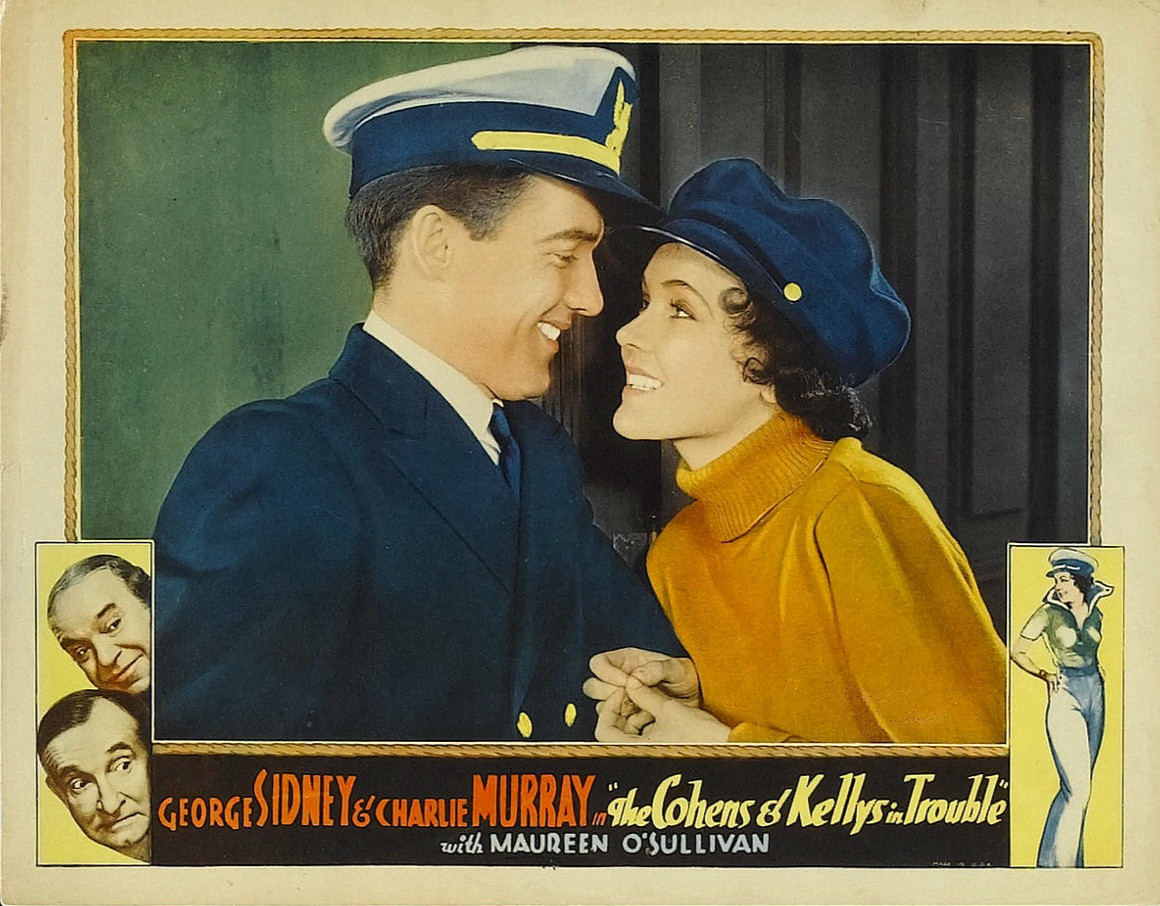
- Lobby card
- Directed by: George Stevens
- Written by: Albert Austin; Homer Croy; Fred Guiol; Jack Jungmeyer; Vernon Smith
- Produced by: Carl Laemmle, Jr.
- Starring: George Sidney; Charlie Murray; Maureen O'Sullivan
- Cinematography: Len Powers
- Edited by: Robert Carlisle
- Music by: James Huntley (uncredited)
- Distributed by: Universal Pictures
- Release date: April 15, 1933
- Running time: 69 minutes
- Country: United States
- Language: English

The Cohens and Kellys in Trouble is a 1933 American pre-Code comedy film starring Charlie Murray, Andy Devine, and Maureen O'Sullivan. It is the last film in the Cohens and Kellys series and the first director credit for George Stevens.

== Plot ==
Kelly's daughter falls for a revenue agent, and his divorced wife is after alimony.

== Cast ==
- George Sidney - Nathan Cohen
- Charles Murray - Patrick Kelly
- Maureen O'Sullivan - Mollie Kelly
- Andy Devine - Andy Anderson
- Jobyna Howland - Queenie Truelove
- Maude Fulton - Miss Fern
- Frank Albertson - Bob Graham
- Henry Armetta - Captain Silva

== Preservation status ==
A copy is held in the Library of Congress collection Packard Campus for Audio-Visual Conservation.
