= Caught Cheating =

1931 film directed by Frank R. Strayer

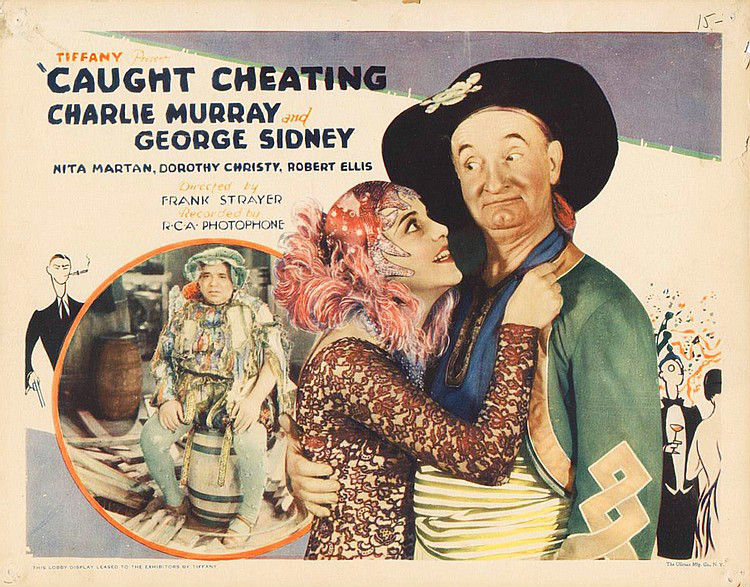
- Lobby card
- Directed by: Frank R. Strayer
- Screenplay by: W. Scott Darling; Frances Hyland
- Story by: Dale Henry
- Produced by: Phil Goldstone
- Starring: Charles Murray; George Sidney; Nita Martan
- Cinematography: Max Dupont
- Edited by: Edgar Adams
- Production company: Tiffany Productions
- Distributed by: Tiffany Productions
- Release date: January 31, 1931 (U.S.)
- Running time: 65 minutes
- Country: United States
- Language: English

Caught Cheating is a 1931 American Pre-Code comedy film directed by Frank R. Strayer from a screenplay by W. Scott Darling. The film stars Charles Murray, George Sidney, and Nita Martan, and it was released by Tiffany Productions on January 31, 1931.

== Plot ==
Madelynne Cabrone is the wife of gangster Joe Cabrone. She is having an affair, and her husband finds out about it and tracks her to a roadhouse, intent on killing her lover. She escapes in her car, but when it breaks down, she takes to the road, where she is picked up by the unwitting Sam Harris. Joe catches up to them, and believes Sam to be the man Madelynne is having an affair with. He is about to move in to kill him, when Sam is stopped for speeding. When Madelynne tells her story, it is printed in the papers, and Sam becomes something of a hero for saving her.

Joe vows to kill Sam within twenty-four hours. T. McGillicuddy Hungerford, a wealthy businessman hears of Sam's heroism and offers to give Sam a huge order. Thinking that the order is dependent on him playing the hero, Sam keeps up with the pretense, although he is scared to death. A rival gangster, Tobey Moran, gives Sam two bodyguards to protect him from Cabrone. As part of Cabrone's plan to kill Sam, he sends him two tickets to a masquerade party at a local speakeasy. McGillicuddy, known as "Mac" wants Sam to go to the masquerade with him and two women. Since all wear masks, no one knows that one of the women is Madelynne.

Sam's wife, Lena, believes that he is cheating on her, and also goes to the masquerade. Cabrone and his men show up as well, dressed as policemen. They abscond with Sam and Mac, taking them back to their hideout. Moran's men follow and a gunfight ensues where Cabrone and his gang are wiped out. The police arrive and declare Sam and Mac to be heroes, whereafter Mac awards the contract to Sam, and Lena understands the truth about Sam and Madelynne and forgives him.

== Cast ==
- Charles Murray as T. McGillicuddy Hungerford
- George Sidney as Sam Harris
- Nita Martan as Madelynne Cabrone
- Robert Ellis as Joe Cabrone
- Dorothy Christy as Tessie
- Bertha Mann as Lena Harris
- Fred Malatesta as Tobey Moran
- George Regas as Guisseppe
- Tenen Holtz
- Gertrude Sutton

== Production ==
In October 1930 it was reported that W. Scott Darling was writing the screenplay for the film, based on a story by Dale Henry. The stars were announced as Charles Murray and George Sidney. In November, it was revealed that Bertha Mann, Fred Malatesta, George Regas, and Sally Carter had been added to the cast. The shower/bath scene featuring Dorothy Christy took over 6 hours to film. Production on the film was completed by early December 1930.

== Reception ==
The Film Daily gave the film a good review, stating, "Broad farce comedy carries plenty of laughs in sophisticated story that runs pretty risqué. Not for the kiddies." They felt the direction was very good and also complimented the cinematography. Meanwhile, Harrison's Reports was much less enthusiastic about the film, feeling the first half of the film was slow, while the second half did contain some interesting humor. Overall, they said, "the picture on the whole is nothing to brag about."
