= Alfred A. Cohn =

American screenwriter (1880–1951)

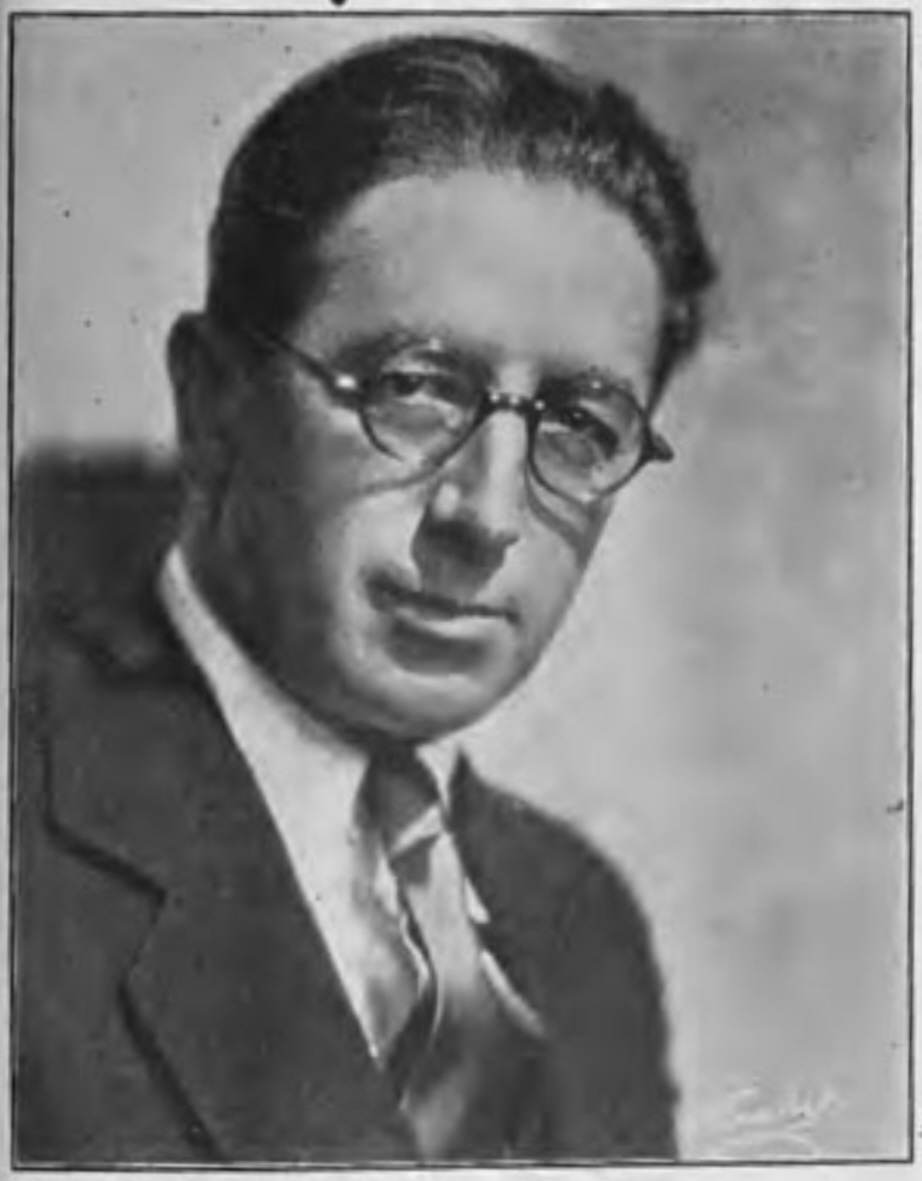
Cohn c. 1928

Alfred A. Cohn (March 26, 1880 – February 3, 1951) was an American author, journalist and newspaper editor, Police Commissioner, and screenwriter of the 1920s and 1930s. He worked on The Jazz Singer, which was nominated for (but did not win) an Academy Award for Best Adapted Screenplay in the 1st Academy Awards of 1929.

== Early life and career ==
Cohn was born in Freeport, Illinois, but subsequently moved to Cleveland, Ohio where he began work as a newspaper editor and journalist. He then moved to Galveston, Texas, where he ran a newspaper, as he would also soon do in Arizona where, in 1908, he was the manager and editor of The Bisbee Miner.

Following his career in journalism, he moved to Arizona and participated as a secretary in the Arizona constitutional convention which led to its statehood in 1912.

== Film career ==
In the 1920s, he moved to Los Angeles, California and began working as a writer, first doing title cards for silent films and, later, scripts and adaptations. He was a co-writer on the 1926 film The Cohens and Kellys, the first of the six-film Cohens and Kellys franchise. His work on adapting The Jazz Singer, one of the first motion pictures with sound, from a play and short story by Samson Raphaelson, led to his first and only nomination for an Academy Award. During this period, he was a prolific writer and wrote more than 100 scripts, roughly 40 of which were produced into films.

In the 1930s, he retired from screenwriting and was appointed the Police Commissioner of Los Angeles, and he continued writing as a short story writer. He died of a heart condition in 1951.

== Partial filmography ==
- Jazzmania (1923)
- The Unknown Purple (1923)
- The Drums of Jeopardy (1923)
- Fashion Row (1924)
- Half-A-Dollar-Bill (1924)
- In Fast Company (1924)
- The Legend of Hollywood (1924)
- Which Shall It Be? (1924)
- Friendly Enemies (1925)
- The Cohens and Kellys (1926)
- The Midnight Kiss (1926)
- Flames (1926)
- Frisco Sally Levy (1927)
- The Cat and the Canary (1927)
- The Jazz Singer (1927)
- The Cohens and the Kellys in Paris (1928)
- We Americans (1928)
- The Last Warning (1928)
- The Carnation Kid (1929)
- Divorce Made Easy (1929)
- Always Faithful (1929)
- The Melancholy Dame (1929)
- Numbered Men (1930)
- Sweethearts on Parade (1930)
- A Holy Terror (1931)
- Mystery Ranch (1932)
- Son of a Sailor (1933)
- Harold Teen (1934)
