= Sweet Daddies =

1926 film

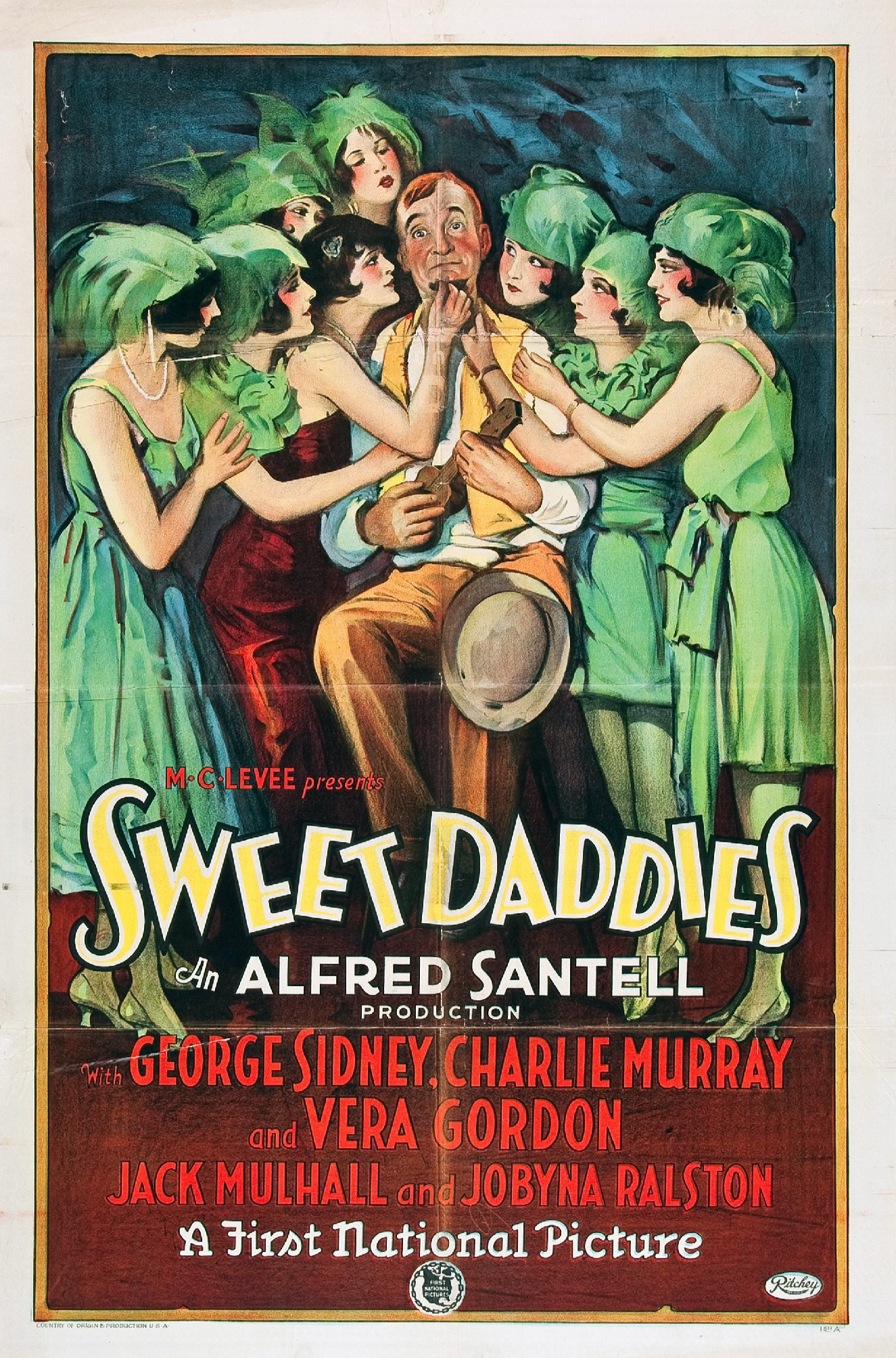
- Poster
- Directed by: Alfred Santell
- Written by: W.C. Clifford; George Marion Jr.
- Produced by: M. C. Levee
- Starring: George Sidney; Charles Murray; Vera Gordon
- Cinematography: Arthur Edeson
- Edited by: Frank Lawrence
- Production company: First National Pictures
- Distributed by: First National Pictures
- Release date: June 13, 1926
- Running time: 70 minutes
- Country: United States
- Language: Silent (English intertitles)

Sweet Daddies is a 1926 American silent comedy crime film directed by Alfred Santell and starring George Sidney, Charles Murray, and Vera Gordon. The film foregrounds positive relationships between Jewish and Irish American characters, despite the presence of some stereotypes.

The plot revolves around comedic mishaps in the bootleg liquor business. The romance between the daughter of the Jewish Finkelstein family and the son of the Irish O’Brien family ends happily.

== Cast ==
- George Sidney as Abie Finklebaum
- Charles Murray as Patrick O'Brien
- Vera Gordon as Rose Finklebaum
- Jobyna Ralston as Mariam Finklebaum
- Jack Mulhall as Jimmy O'Brien
- Gaston Glass as Sam Berkowitz
- Aggie Herring as Mrs. O'Brien

== Reception ==
The New York Times film critic described it thus:

One really can't quite grasp what this picture is all about, as there are sudden interruptions, for the sake of comedy, which crop up according to the whims of the director and scenarist. The fun is good-natured, but just about as probable as the dropping of a leather pouch on a schooner's deck from an airplane a couple of thousand feet in the air, which incidentally happens in this tepid affair.

== Impact ==
Sidney and Murray, who portrayed the fathers of the two families, would go on to work together in many films that, focusing on Jewish and Irish relations, were often described as “ethnic comedies.”

Jobyna Robson (Mariam Finkelstein) would go on to be regarded as a great silent film comedian. Arthur Edeson became a major cinematographer.

== Bibliography ==
- Erens, Patricia. The Jew in American Cinema. Indiana University Press, 1984.
