= Alfred Santell =

American film director (1895–1981)

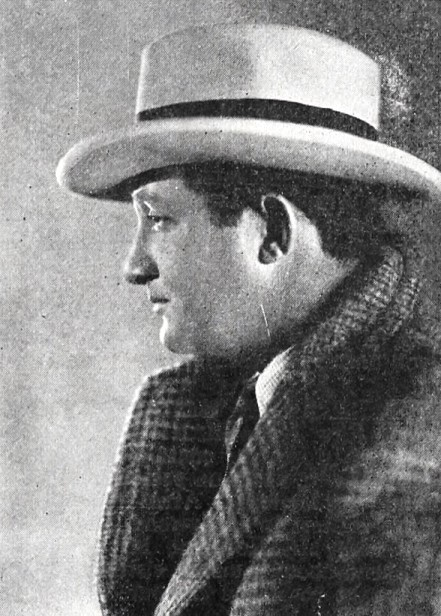
- From a 1925 magazine
- Born: September 14, 1895; San Francisco, California, United States
- Died: June 19, 1981 (aged 85); Salinas, California, United States
- Resting place: Salinas, California
- Occupation: Film director
- Years active: 1915–1946

Alfred Allen Santell (September 14, 1895 – June 19, 1981) was an American film director and film producer.

== Career ==
Santell directed over 60 films, beginning in 1917, most of which were two-reel comedy short subjects for Hal Roach and other productions companies. Taking up feature films from about 1924, Santell worked for several major studios.

In 1934, he was married to actress Jane N. Keithley; they remained married until her death.

He left the business in 1947 after a contract dispute with Republic Studios.

Santell died on June 19, 1981, in Salinas, California.

== Partial filmography ==
- Beloved Rogues (1917)
- A Whirlwind of Whiskers (1917)
- It Might Happen to You (1920)
- Wildcat Jordan (1922)
- Lights Out (1923)
- Empty Hearts (1924)
- The Man Who Played Square (1924)
- Fools in the Dark (1924)
- Parisian Nights (1925)
- The Marriage Whirl (1925)
- Classified (1925)
- Bluebeard's Seven Wives (1926)
- The Dancer of Paris (1926)
- Just Another Blonde (1926)
- Sweet Daddies (1926)
- Subway Sadie (1926)
- Orchids and Ermine (1927)
- The Patent Leather Kid (1927)
- The Gorilla (1927)
- The Little Shepherd of Kingdom Come (1928)
- Show Girl (1928)
- Wheel of Chance (1928)
- This Is Heaven (1929)
- Twin Beds (1929)
- Romance of the Rio Grande (1929)
- The Sea Wolf (1930)
- The Arizona Kid (1930)
- Body and Soul (1931)
- Daddy Long Legs (1931)
- Sob Sister (1931)
- Polly of the Circus (1932)
- Rebecca of Sunnybrook Farm (1932)
- Tess of the Storm Country (1932)
- The Right to Romance (1933)
- Bondage (1933)
- The Life of Vergie Winters (1934)
- People Will Talk (1935)
- A Feather in Her Hat (1935)
- Winterset (1936)
- Internes Can't Take Money (1937)
- Breakfast for Two (1937)
- Cocoanut Grove (1938)
- Having Wonderful Time (1938)
- The Arkansas Traveler (1938)
- Our Leading Citizen (1939)
- Aloma of the South Seas (1941)
- Beyond the Blue Horizon (1942)
- Jack London (1943)
- The Hairy Ape (1944)
- Mexicana (1945)
- That Brennan Girl (1946)
