= The Cohens and the Kellys in Atlantic City =

1929 film

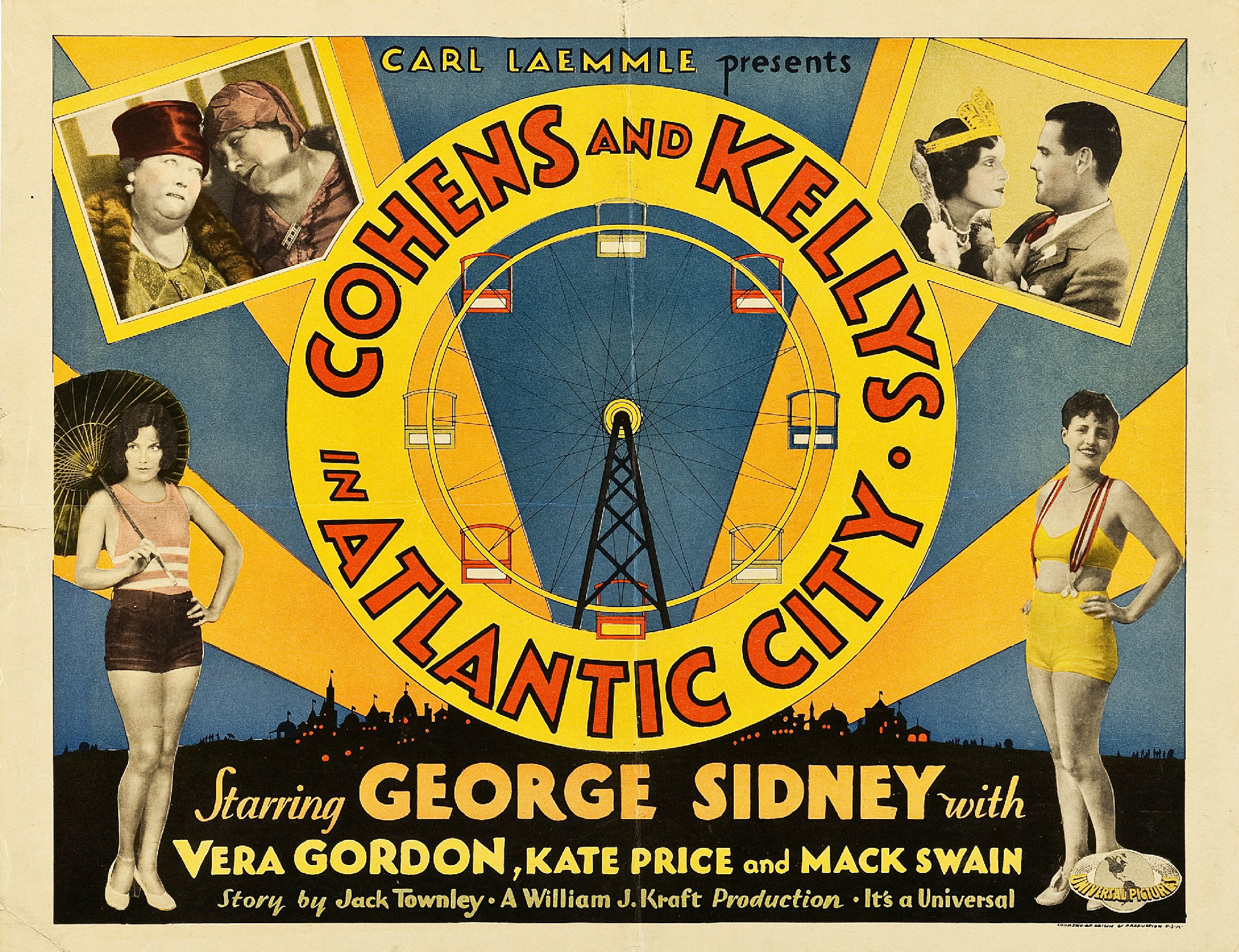
- Lobby card
- Directed by: William James Craft
- Written by: Albert DeMond; Earle Snell; Jack Townley
- Based on: Two Blocks Away by Aaron Hoffman
- Produced by: Carl Laemmle
- Starring: George Sidney; Vera Gordon; Mack Swain
- Cinematography: Alan Jones
- Edited by: Charles Craft; Richard Cahoon
- Production company: Universal Pictures
- Distributed by: Universal Pictures
- Release date: March 17, 1929
- Running time: 70 minutes
- Country: United States
- Languages: Sound (Part-Talkie); English Intertitles

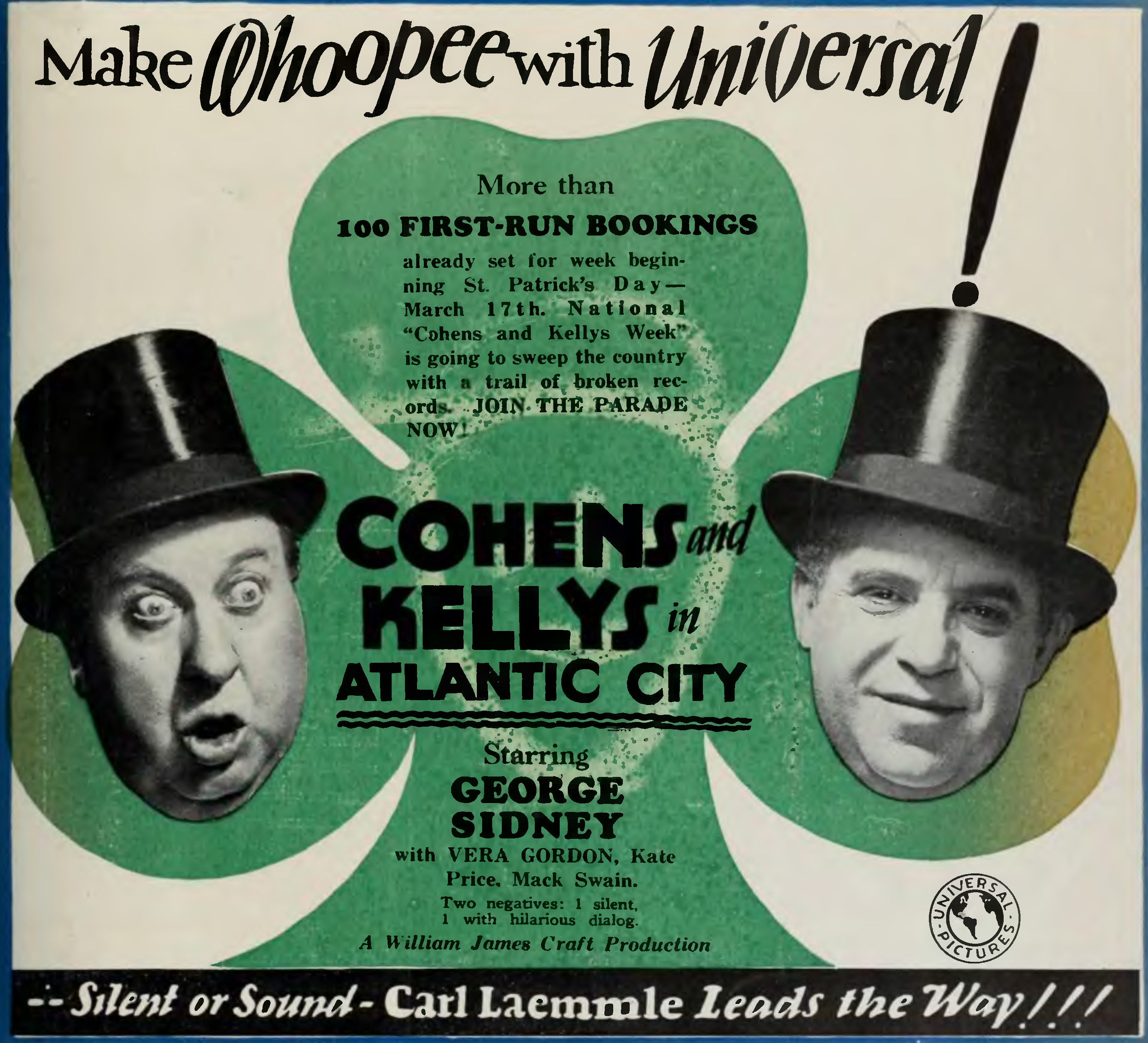
1929 ad in The Film Daily

The Cohens and the Kellys in Atlantic City is a 1929 American sound part-talkie comedy film directed by William James Craft and starring George Sidney, Vera Gordon and Mack Swain. In addition to sequences with audible dialogue or talking sequences, the film features a synchronized musical score and sound effects along with English intertitles. The soundtrack was recorded using the Western Electric sound-on-film system. The film is the third entry in the series which began with The Cohens and Kellys, inspired by a play by Aaron Hoffman. Location shooting took place in Atlantic City. Originally shot as a synchronized film without dialogue, some talking sequences were later added at Universal Studios. A print of The Cohens and the Kellys in Atlantic City exists.

== Synopsis ==
Cohen and Kelly's bathing suit business is struggling financially as they have grown old-fashioned after thirty years. While they are away their respective children Rosalinde and Tom launch a new line of merchandise and promote with a planned beauty contest in the resort of Atlantic City.

== Cast ==
- George Sidney as Nathaniel Cohen
- Vera Gordon as Melitta Cohen
- Mack Swain as Mr. Tom Kelly
- Kate Price as Mary Kelly
- Cornelius Keefe as Tom Kelly Jr.
- Nora Lane as Rosalinde Cohen
- Virginia Sale as Selma Meyer
- Tom Kennedy as Crook
- Walter Brennan as Man at Police Station

== See also ==
- List of early sound feature films (1926–1929)

== Bibliography ==
- Koszarski, Richard. Hollywood on the Hudson: Film and Television in New York from Griffith to Sarnoff. Rutgers University Press, 2008.
