= Lost at the Front =

1927 film

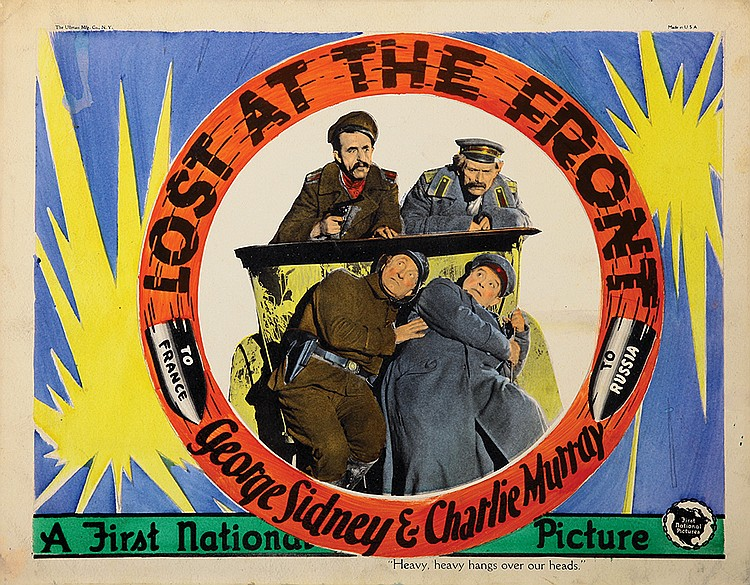
- Directed by: Del Lord
- Screenplay by: Hampton Del Ruth; Frank Griffin; Ralph Spence
- Produced by: Frank Griffin
- Starring: George Sidney; Charles Murray; Natalie Kingston; John Kolb; Max Asher; Brooks Benedict
- Cinematography: James Van Trees
- Production company: John McCormick Productions
- Distributed by: First National Pictures
- Release date: May 29, 1927
- Running time: 60 minutes
- Country: United States
- Language: Silent (English intertitles)

Lost at the Front is a 1927 American silent comedy film directed by Del Lord and written by Hampton Del Ruth, Frank Griffin, and Ralph Spence. The film stars George Sidney, Charles Murray, Natalie Kingston, John Kolb, Max Asher, and Brooks Benedict. The film was released on May 29, 1927, by First National Pictures.

== Plot ==
According to TCM, two men from the United States join the German and Russian armies, meet on the battlefield, and share misadventures.

== Cast ==
- George Sidney as August Krause
- Charles Murray as Patrick Muldoon
- Natalie Kingston as Olga Pietroff
- John Kolb as Von Herfiz
- Max Asher as Adolph Meyerburg
- Brooks Benedict as The Inventor
- Ed Brady as Captain Kashluff
- Harry Lipman as Captain Levinsky
- Nita Martan as Russian girl
- Nina Romano as Russian girl

== Preservation ==
With no prints of Lost at the Front located in any film archives, it is a lost film.
