= Around the Corner =

1930 film

- Directed by: Bert Glennon
- Written by: Jo Swerling
- Produced by: Harry Cohn
- Starring: George Sidney; Charles Murray; Joan Peers
- Cinematography: Joseph Walker
- Edited by: Gene Milford
- Production company: Columbia Pictures
- Distributed by: Columbia Pictures
- Release date: April 25, 1930
- Running time: 68 minutes
- Country: United States
- Language: English

Around the Corner is a 1930 American comedy-drama film directed by Bert Glennon and starring George Sidney, Charles Murray and Joan Peers. It was produced and distributed by Columbia Pictures.

== Plot ==
Rosie Kaplan O'Grady, an abandoned child, is adopted and raised by two men of different backgrounds—a Jewish pawnbroker and an Irish policeman. As she grows up, she becomes involved in a series of romantic and social complications that reflect the contrasting influences of her upbringing. Her relationships and personal choices lead to tensions and misunderstandings, which are eventually resolved as she reconciles her identity and future.

== Cast ==
- George Sidney as Kaplan
- Charles Murray as O'Grady
- Joan Peers as Rosie
- Charles Delaney as Terry Callahan
- Larry Kent as Tommy Sinclair
- Jesse De Vorska as Moe Levine
- Frederick Sullivan as Sinclair Sr
- Harry Strang as Mac

== Bibliography ==
- Alan G. Fetrow. Sound films, 1927-1939: a United States filmography. McFarland, 1992.
