= Classified (1925 film) =

1925 film by Alfred Santell

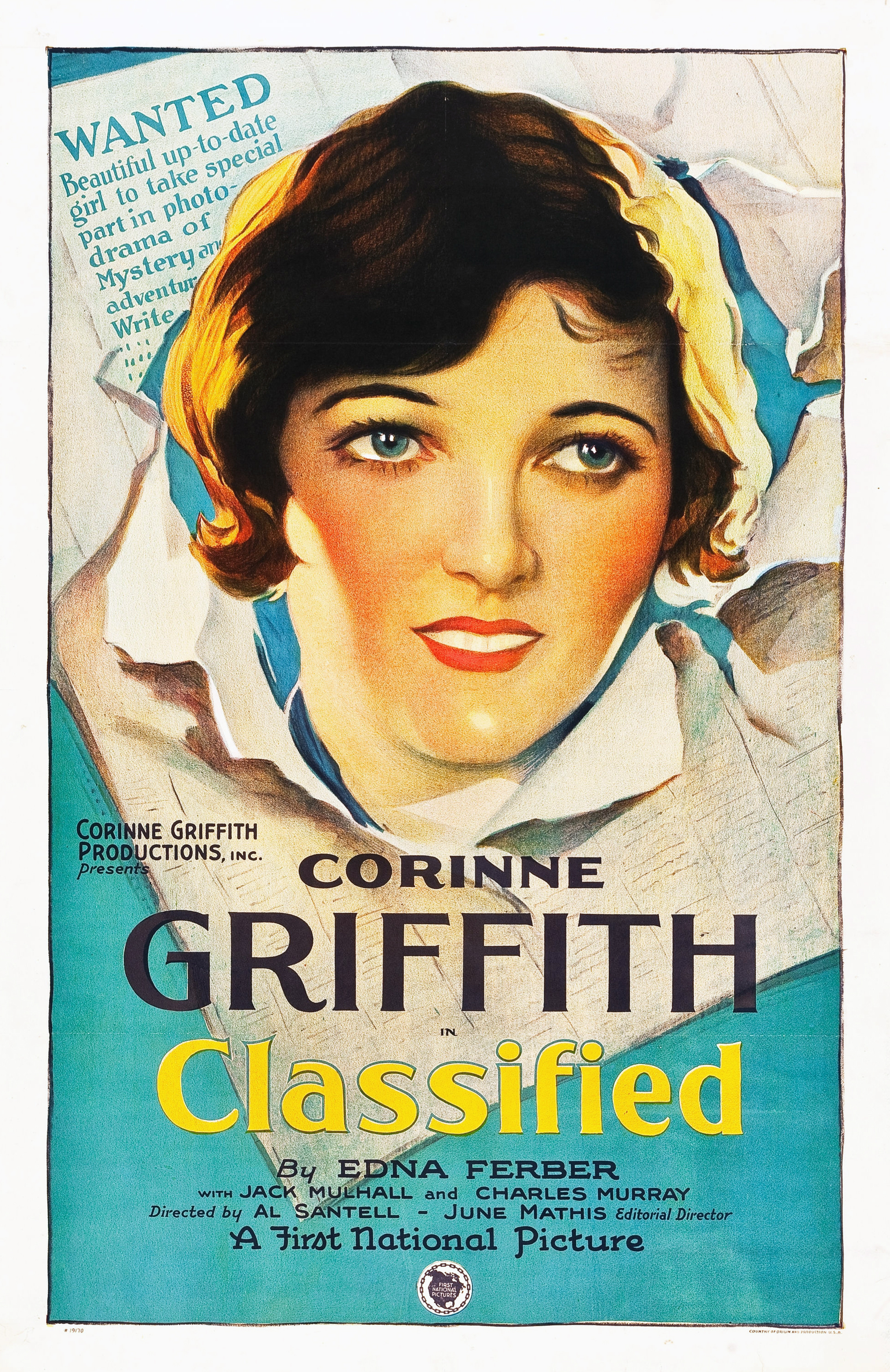
- Theatrical release poster
- Directed by: Alfred Santell; Scott Beal (assistant)
- Written by: June Mathis
- Based on: Classified by Edna Ferber
- Produced by: Corinne Griffith
- Starring: Corinne Griffith
- Cinematography: Harold Rosson
- Edited by: Cyril Gardner
- Distributed by: First National Pictures
- Release date: October 11, 1925
- Running time: 7 reels
- Country: United States
- Language: Silent (English intertitles)

Classified is a 1925 American silent drama film directed by Alfred Santell and produced by and starring Corinne Griffith. It was based on a novel by Edna Ferber and distributed through First National Pictures.

The film was remade as Hard to Get by First National (subsidiary by Warner Brothers) in 1929 as an early talkie for Dorothy Mackaill, a Corinne Griffith rival at First National.

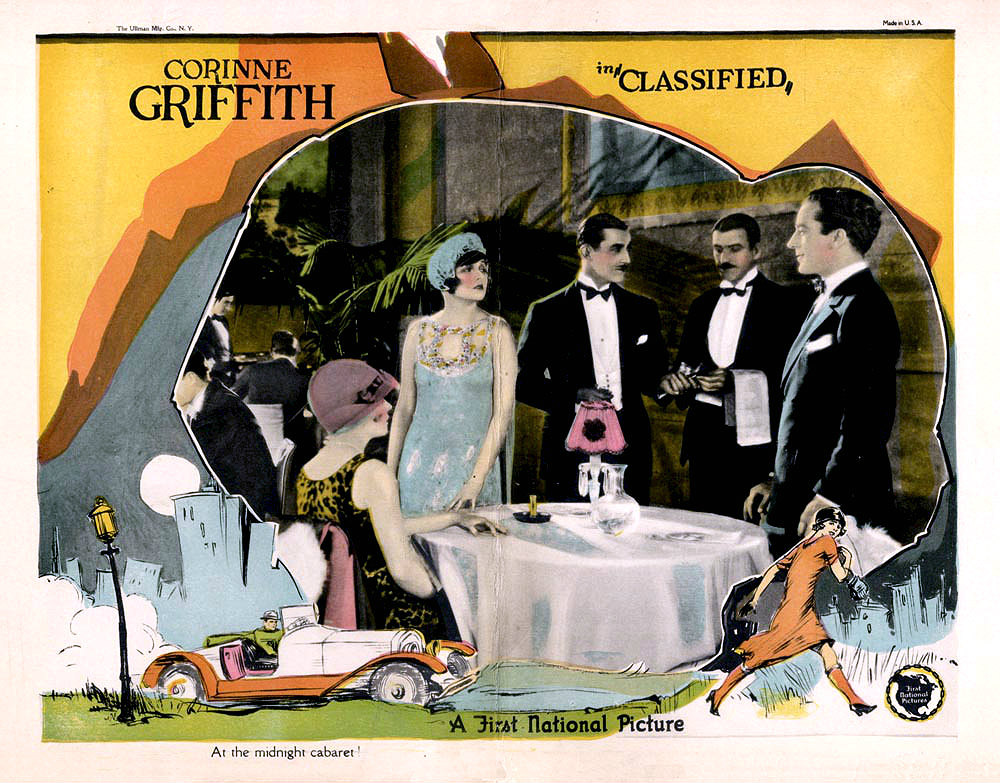
Lobby card for Classified

== Plot ==
As described in a film magazine review, a telephone operator in the classified advertisement department of a metropolitan daily newspaper longs to get away from her drab surroundings and onto Fifth Avenue. She accepts many invitations from men to ride down the avenue with them in their cars, but up to the time she meets one rich young man is successful in evading their advances. Then she meets a handsome chap who drives a flivver, and, despite its poor condition, is interested in him nevertheless. One night after a motor trip into the country that does not end well, she decides that it is the man of the flivver she wants.

== Cast ==
- Corinne Griffith as Babs Comet
- Jack Mulhall as Lloyd Whiting
- Ward Crane as Spencer Clark
- Carroll Nye as Mart Comet
- Charles Murray as Old Man Comet
- Edythe Chapman as "Maw" Comet
- Julie Bishop as Jeanette (credited as Jacqueline Wells)
- George Sidney as Weinstein
- Bernard Randall as Bernstein

== Preservation ==
A print of Classified has been preserved at the Library of Congress and the Wisconsin Center for Film and Theater Research.
