= George Sidney (actor) =

Hungarian-American actor and comedian (1876–1945)

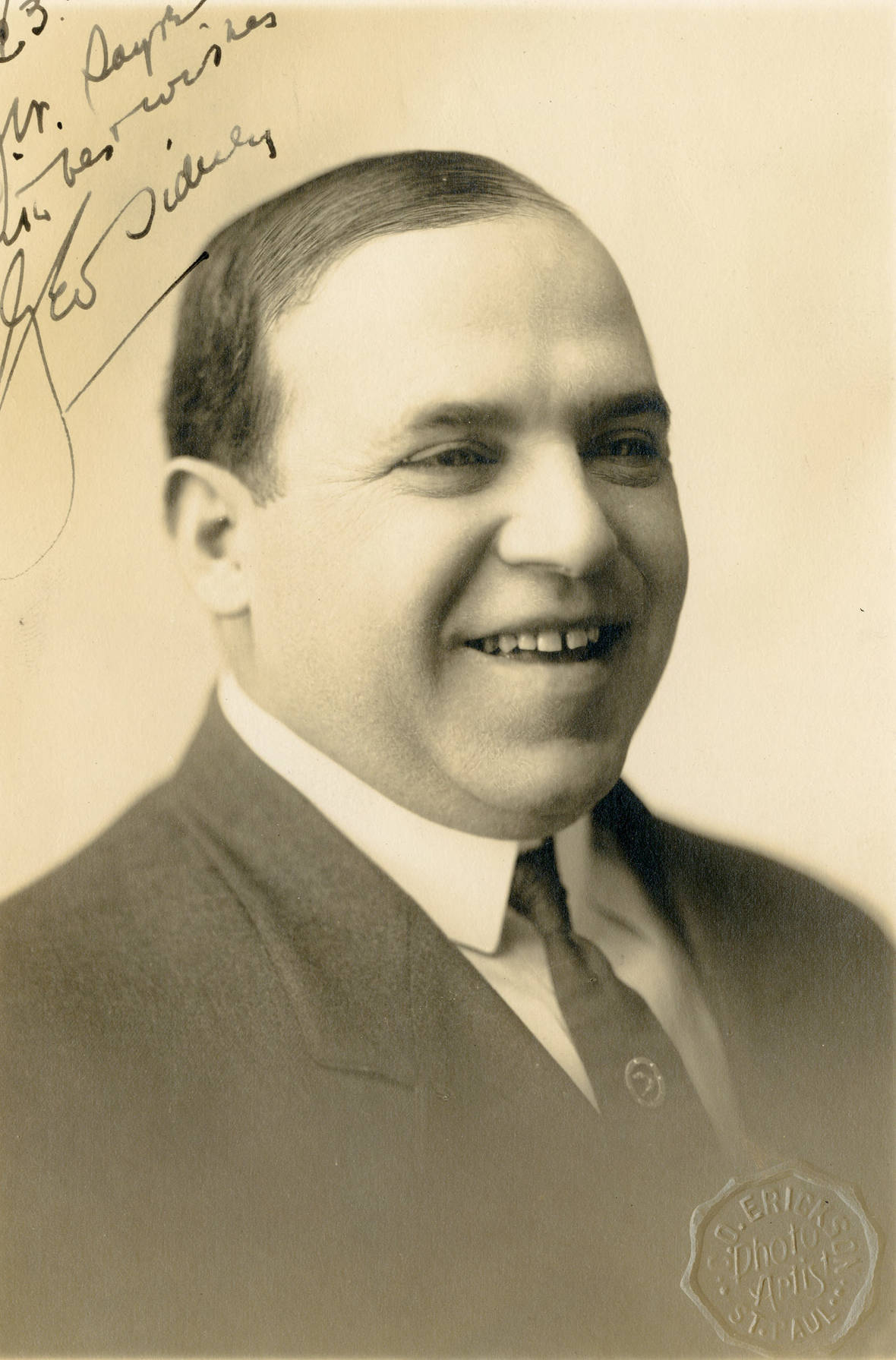
- Sidney in 1911
- Born: Sammy Greenfield; 18 March 1876; Nagynichal, Austro-Hungarian Empire
- Died: 29 April 1945 (aged 69); Los Angeles, California, U.S.
- Resting place: Beth Olam Cemetery of Hollywood
- Occupations: Actor; Comedian
- Years active: 1915–1937
- Relatives: George Sidney (nephew)

George Sidney (born Sammy Greenfield; 18 March 1876 – 29 April 1945) was a Hungarian-born American film actor and comedian. He starred in The Cohens and Kellys film series.

== Early years ==
Born in Nagynichal, Hungary, Sidney was the son of Lewis K. Sidney, an executive at Metro-Goldwyn-Mayer. He was the uncle of the film director George Sidney.

== Career ==
In his youth, Sidney performed on amateur night programs at Miner's Bowery Theatre in New York City. His professional debut came at the Harlem Museum], and he went on to perform in burlesque. In his film debut he portrayed Potash in In Hollywood with Potash and Perlmutter.

== Death ==
On April 29, 1945, Sidney died at his home in Los Angeles, aged 69. He was buried in Beth Olam Cemetery of Hollywood.

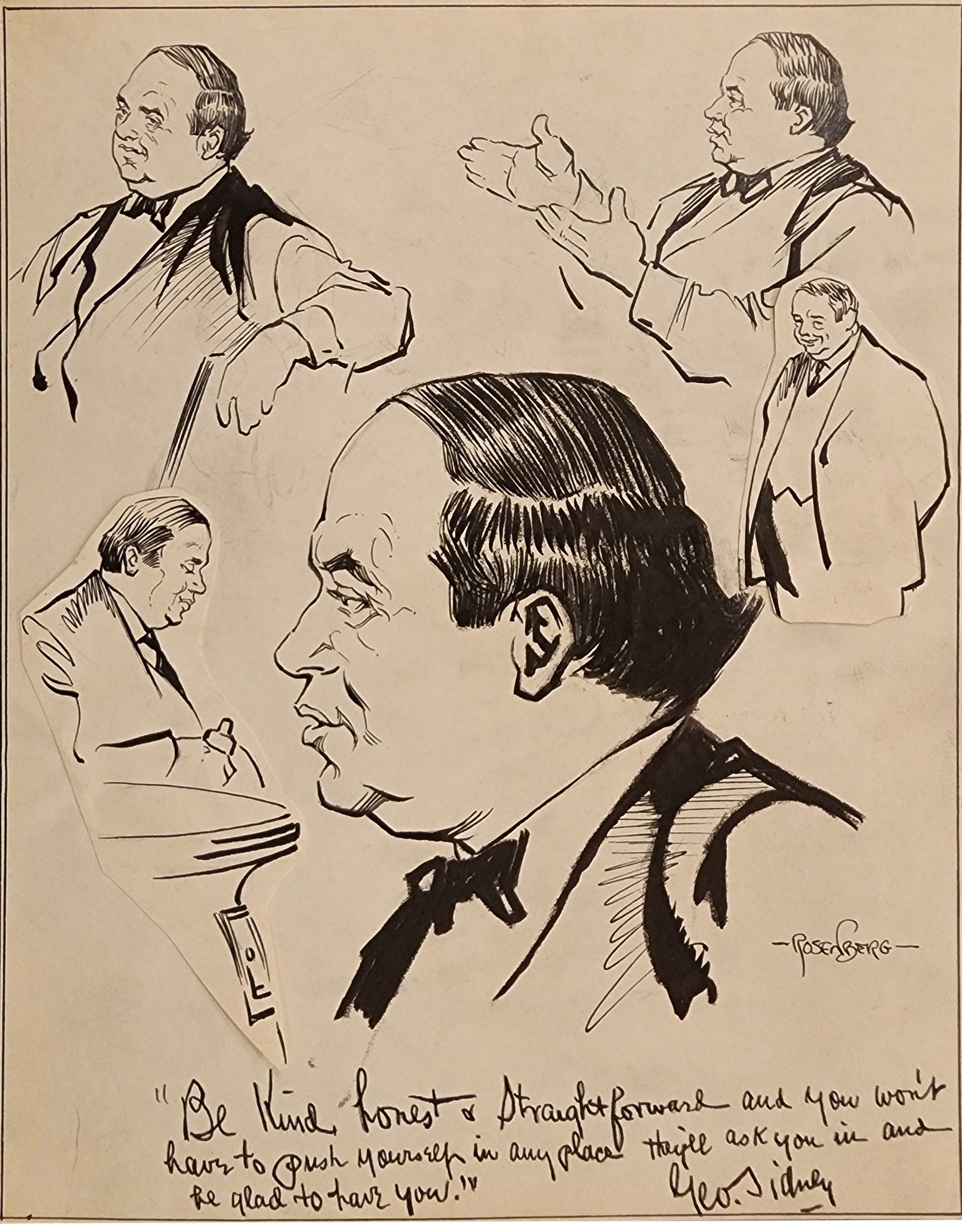
Signed drawing of George Sidney by Manuel Rosenberg for the Cincinnati Post 1921

== Selected filmography ==
- In Hollywood with Potash and Perlmutter (1924)
- Classified (1925)
- The Cohens and Kellys (1926)
- The Prince of Pilsen (1926)
- Millionaires (1926)
- Sweet Daddies (1926)
- Partners Again (1926)
- The Auctioneer (1927)
- Clancy's Kosher Wedding (1927)
- For the Love of Mike (1927)
- Lost at the Front (1927)
- The Life of Riley (1927)
- The Latest from Paris (1928)
- Flying Romeos (1928)
- We Americans (1928)
- Give and Take (1928)
- The Cohens and the Kellys in Paris (1928)
- The Cohens and Kellys in Atlantic City (1929)
- The Cohens and the Kellys in Scotland (1930)
- The Cohens and the Kellys in Africa (1930)
- Around the Corner (1930)
- Caught Cheating (1931)
- The Heart of New York (1932)
- High Pressure (1932)
- The Cohens and Kellys in Hollywood (1932)
- The Cohens and Kellys in Trouble (1933)
- Rafter Romance (1933)
- Manhattan Melodrama (1934)
- Diamond Jim (1935)
- The Good Old Soak (1937)

== Bibliography ==
- Kear, Lynn & King, James. Evelyn Brent: The Life and Films of Hollywood's Lady Crook. McFarland & Co, 2009.
- Munden, Kenneth White. The American Film Institute Catalog of Motion Pictures Produced in the United States, Part 1. University of California Press, 1997.
