= The Pill Pounder =

1923 silent film

- Directed by: Gregory La Cava
- Produced by: C.C. Burr
- Starring: Charles Murray; Clara Bow; James Turfler
- Cinematography: Charles E. Gilson
- Production company: All Star Comedies
- Release date: April 22, 1923
- Running time: 20 minutes (2 reels)
- Country: United States

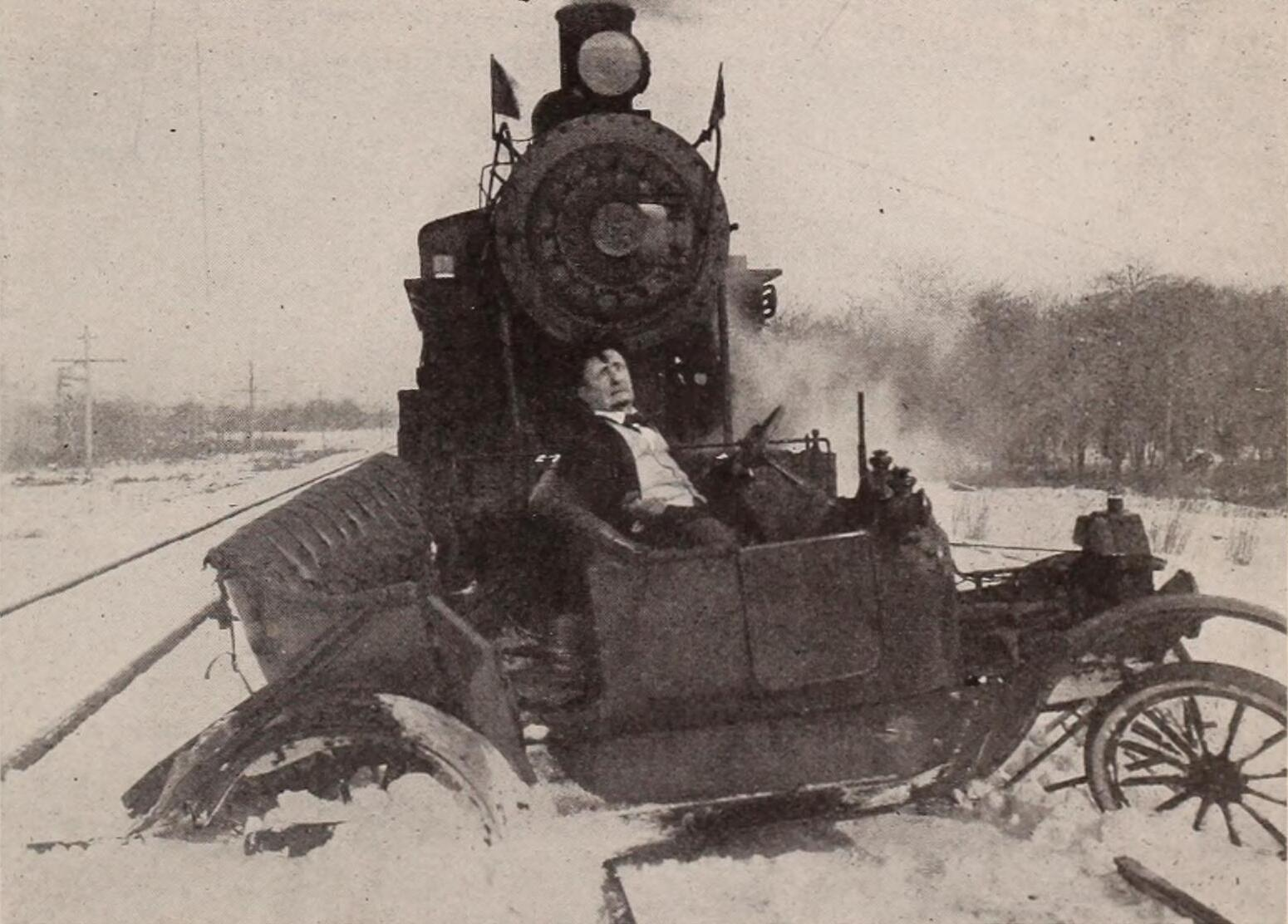
A still from the film, featuring Charles Murray

Several scenes from the film

The Pill Pounder is a 1923 silent film starring Charles Murray and featuring Clara Bow. The film is 20 minutes long. It was a lost film until a print was found at an auction in Omaha, Nebraska in 2023.

== Plot ==
Charles Murray is a druggist ("pill pounder") who tries to host a clandestine poker game in the back room of his drugstore.

== Details ==
The two-reel film was shot on Long Island, New York. It was directed by Gregory La Cava and features Bow and "rubber-faced vaudeville veteran Charlie Murray".

== Reception ==
In their April 28, 1923 edition, Exhibitors Herald "unhesitatingly recommended" the film.

== Rediscovery and Exhibition ==
The film was purchased in a lot from a bankrupt distributor Modern Sound Pictures at an auction in 2023. The film was included in a pallet of film canisters, bought for $20. The purchaser noticed a few rare films in the lot, which could only be purchased as a unit. The lost film, which was found to be a 35mm print from either the 1950s or 1960s to be included in an anthology, was in good condition. However, this copy was missing its intertitles as well as some scenes and shots. It was cleaned up and projected for audiences at the San Francisco Silent Film Festival on April 11, 2024.
