= The Life of Riley (1927 film) =

1927 film

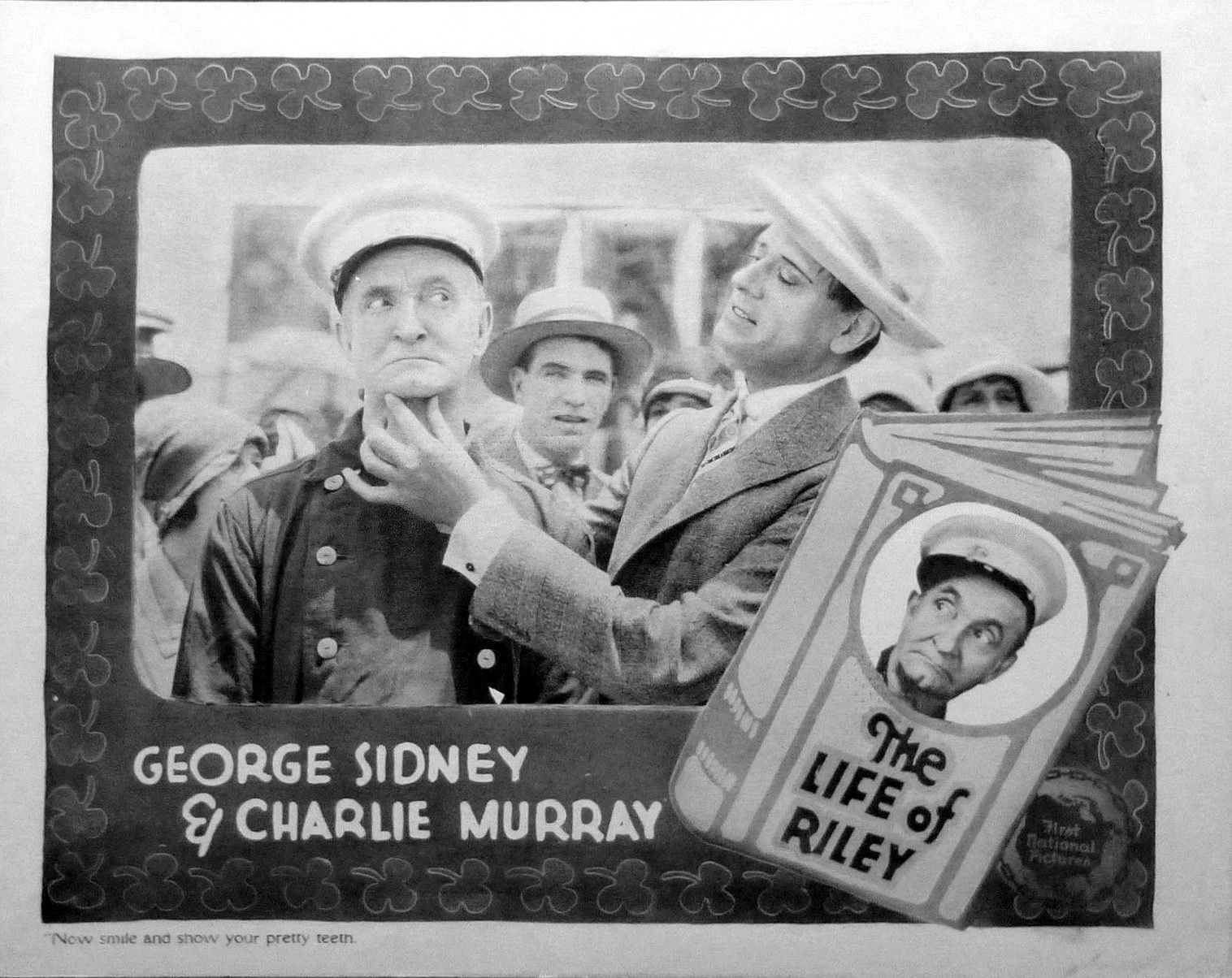
- Lobby card
- Directed by: William Beaudine
- Written by: Curtis Benton; Howard J. Green (adaptation); Sidney Lazarus (titles); Gene Towne (titles)
- Story by: Mann Page
- Starring: Charles Murray
- Cinematography: Charles Van Enger
- Distributed by: First National
- Release date: September 3, 1927
- Running time: 70 minutes
- Country: United States
- Language: Silent (English intertitles)

The Life of Riley is a 1927 American silent comedy film directed by William Beaudine. Distributed by First National, the film stars Charles Murray in the title role, George Sidney, Stephen Carr, and June Marlowe. The Life of Riley is now presumed lost.

== Cast ==
- Charles Murray as Timothy Riley (fire chief)
- George Sidney as Otto Meyer (police chief)
- Stephen Carr as Steve Meyer
- June Marlowe as Molly O'Rourke
- Myrtle Stedman as Penelope Jones
- Sam Hardy as Al Montague
- Bert Woodruff as Aaron Brown
- Edwards Davis as John King
