= The Cohens and the Kellys in Scotland =

1930 film

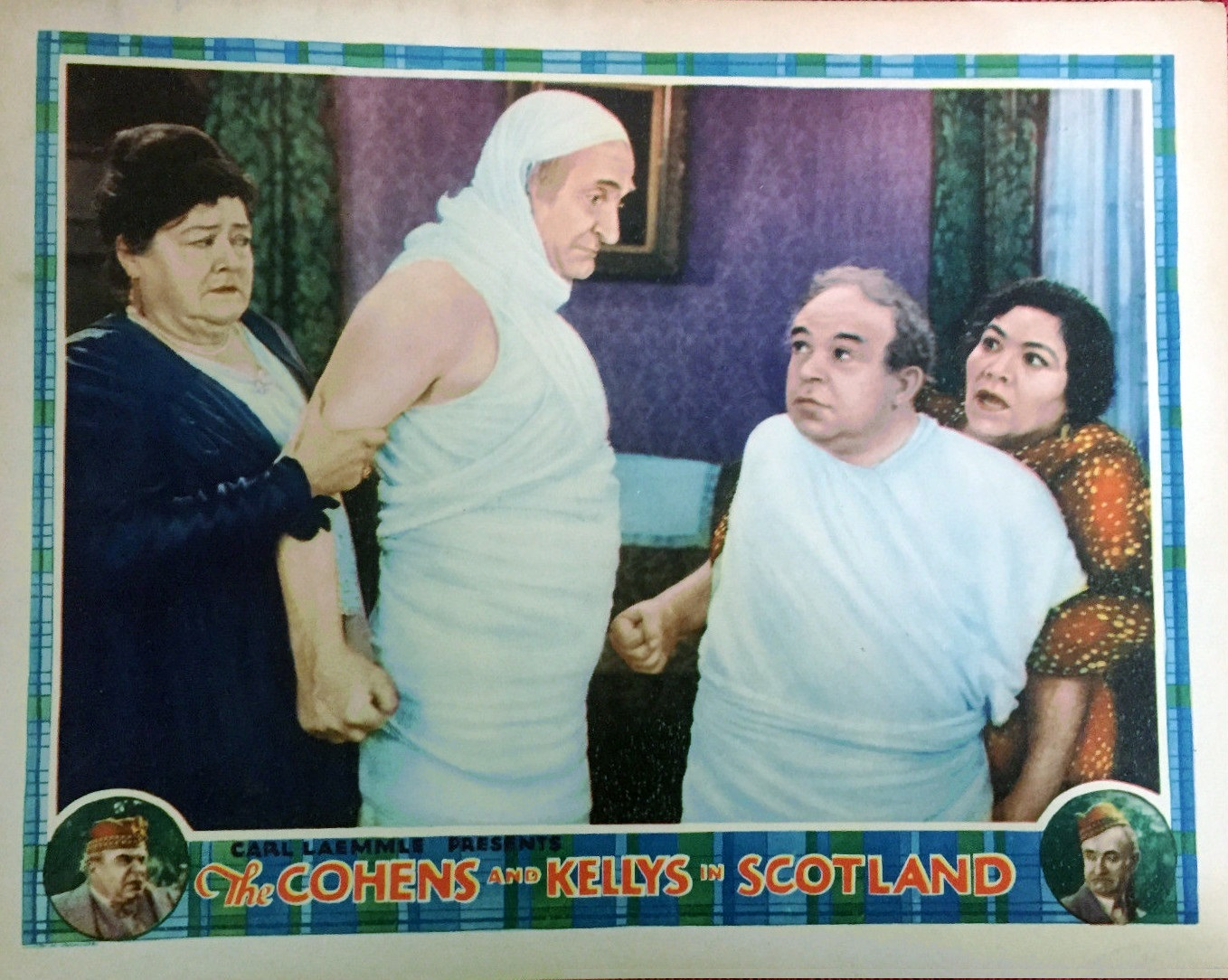
- Lobby card
- Directed by: William James Craft
- Written by: Albert DeMond
- Based on: a story by John McDermott
- Produced by: Carl Laemmle
- Starring: George Sidney
- Cinematography: Alan Jones
- Edited by: Harry W. Lieb
- Music by: Heinz Roemheld
- Production company: Universal Pictures
- Distributed by: Universal Pictures
- Release date: March 1, 1930
- Running time: 84 minutes
- Country: United States
- Language: English

The Cohens and the Kellys in Scotland is a 1930 American comedy film. It is one of The Cohens and Kellys series, and is also the series' first sound film. It was directed by William James Craft and produced and released by Universal Pictures.

== Cast ==
- George Sidney as Cohen
- Charles Murray as Kelly
- Vera Gordon as Mrs. Cohen
- Kate Price as Mrs. Kelly
- E. J. Ratcliffe as McPherson
- William Colvin as McDonald
- Lloyd Whitlock as Prince
- John McDermott (uncredited)

== Preservation ==
The film and trailer are preserved in the Library of Congress collection.
