= Charles Murray (American actor) =

American actor (1872–1941)

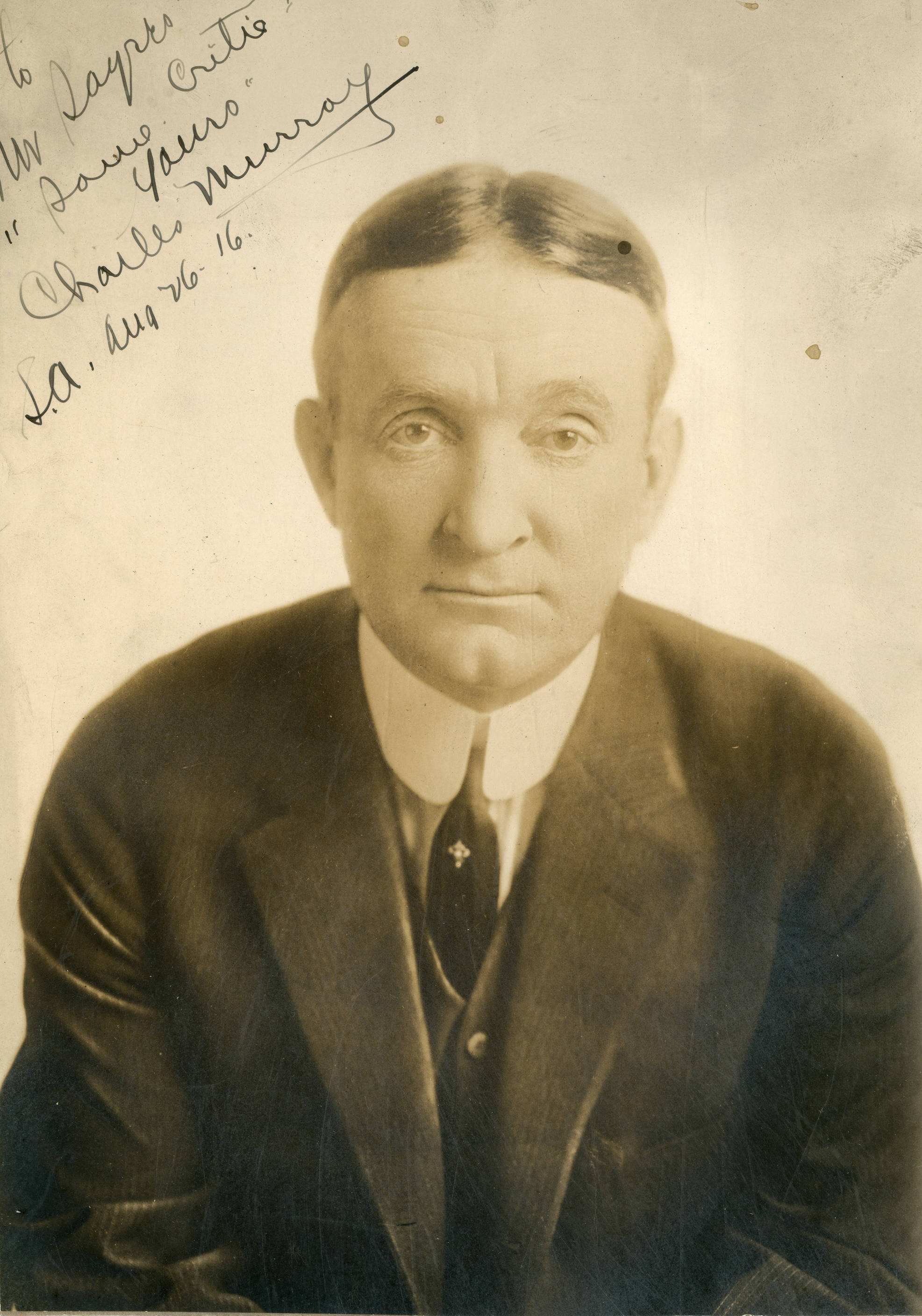
- Murray in 1916
- Born: Charles Albert Murray; June 22, 1872; Laurel, Indiana, US
- Died: July 29, 1941 (aged 69); Los Angeles, California, US
- Occupation: Actor
- Years active: 1912–1938

Charles Albert Murray (June 22, 1872 – July 29, 1941) was an American film actor of the silent era.

Murray was born in Laurel, Indiana, on June 22, 1872, to Isaac Murray and Martha Ellen "Mollie" Murray (née Sullenburger).

Murray was a comedian in vaudeville and on stage for 20 years, forming the Murray and Mack team, before he began acting in films. His first work in films was for Biograph. His work in films included appearing in The Cohens and Kellys series with George Sidney. He appeared in more than 280 films between 1912 and 1938, starting with film shorts. He also directed five films.

Murray was married to Nellie Bae Hamilton. He died in Los Angeles, California, from pneumonia. For his contribution to motion pictures, decades after his death, he was honored with a star on the Hollywood Walk of Fame at 1725 Vine Street.

== Selected filmography ==
- His Auto's Maiden Trip (1912, Short)
- Safe in Jail (1913, Short)
- Murphy's I.O.U. (1913, Short) - (uncredited)
- Red Hicks Defies the World (1913, Short) - Red Hicks
- Almost a Wild Man (1913, Short) - McDoo
- The Mothering Heart (1913, Short) - Male Apache Dancer
- Professor Bean's Removal (1913, Short)
- The Riot (1913, Short)
- With the Aid of Phrenology (1913, Short) The Husband
- Two Old Tars (1913, Short)
- Because of a Hat (1914, Short) – Skelley [on split reel with Chocolate Dynamite (1914)]
- Her Friend the Bandit (1914, Short) - Count De Beans
- Mabel's Married Life (1914, Short) - Man in Bar
- Love and Bullets (1914, Short) - Charlie
- The Masquerader (1914, Short) - Film Director
- His New Profession (1914, Short) - Drinker (uncredited)
- Killing Horace (1914, Short) - Horace
- Fatty Again (1914, Short) - Carnival Customer
- The Noise of Bombs (1914, Short) - Constable Murray
- Tillie's Punctured Romance (1914) - Detective in 'A Thief's Fate' (uncredited)
- Rum and Wall Paper (1915, Short) - The Paperhanger
- Hogan's Romance Upset (1915, Short) - Hogan
- Their Social Splash (1915, Short) - Hogan - the Unruly Guest
- Fatty and the Broadway Stars (1915, Short) - Sam Bernard's Director
- Watch Your Neighbor (1918) - M. Balmer, an Undertaker
- Yankee Doodle in Berlin (1919) - An Irish-American Soldier
- Puppy Love (1919) - Shamus O'Connell
- Salome vs. Shenandoah (1919) - 'Herod'
- Married Life (1920) - Patron of the Arts
- Love, Honor and Behave (1920) - His Honor - Judge Fawcett
- A Small Town Idol (1921) - Sheriff Wilbur Sparks
- Home Talent (1921) - The Landlord
- The Crossroads of New York (1922) - Judge
- Luck (1923) - The Plumber
- Bright Lights of Broadway (1923) - El Jumbo
- The Pill Pounder (1923) - Druggist
- Painted People (1924) - Tom Byrne
- Lilies of the Field (1924) - Charles Lee
- Fools Highway (1924) - Mamie's Father
- The Girl in the Limousine (1924) - The Butler
- The Fire Patrol (1924) - Fireman
- Empty Hearts (1924) - Joe Delane
- The Mine with the Iron Door (1924) - Bob Hill
- Sundown (1924) - Pat Meech
- Wizard of Oz (1925) - Wizard of Oz
- Who Cares (1925) - Greaves
- Percy (1925) - Holy Joe
- My Son (1925) - Captain Joe Barnby
- White Fang (1925) - Judson Black
- Fighting the Flames (1925) - Pawnbroker
- Paint and Powder (1925) - Cabman
- Classified (1925) - Old Man Comet
- Why Women Love (1925) - Josiah Scott
- Steel Preferred (1925) - Dicker
- Mike (1926) - Father
- Irene (1926) - Pa O'Dare
- The Reckless Lady (1926) - Gendarme
- The Devil's Circus (1926) - Circus Member (uncredited)
- The Cohens and Kellys (1926) - Patrick Kelly
- Her Second Chance (1926) - Bell
- The Boob (1926) - Cactus Jim
- Sweet Daddies (1926) - Patrick O'Brien
- Mismates (1926) - Black
- Subway Sadie (1926) - Taxicab Driver
- Paradise (1926) - Lord Lumley
- The Silent Lover (1926) - O'Reilly
- The Masked Woman (1927) - André O'Donohue
- McFadden's Flats (1927) - Dan McFadden
- Lost at the Front (1927) - Patrick Muldoon
- The Poor Nut (1927) - Doc Murphy
- The Gorilla (1927) - Garrity
- The Life of Riley (1927) - Timothy Riley (fire chief)
- The Cohens and the Kellys in Paris (1928) - Minor Role
- The Pioneer Scout (1928) - Minor Role
- Flying Romeos (1928) - Cohan
- Vamping Venus (1928) - Michael Cassidy / King Cassidy of Ireland
- The Head Man (1928) - Watts
- Do Your Duty (1928) - Tim Maloney
- The Cohens and the Kellys in Scotland (1930) - Kelly
- Clancy in Wall Street (1930) - Michael Clancy
- King of Jazz (1930) - Comic Specialty (scenes deleted)
- Around the Corner (1930) - O'Grady
- The Cohens and the Kellys in Africa (1930) - Kelly
- Caught Cheating (1931) - T. McGillicuddy Hungerford
- The Stolen Jools (1931, Short) - Kell
- The Cohens and Kellys in Hollywood (1932) - Michael Kelly
- The Cohens and Kellys in Trouble (1933) - Captain Patrick Kelly
- Dangerous Waters (1936) - Chief Engineer McDuffy
- Circus Girl (1937) - Slippery
- County Fair (1937) - Sheriff
- Breaking the Ice (1938) - Janitor
