= Prize Winners =

1916 film

- Produced by: Louis Burstein
- Starring: Oliver Hardy
- Release date: November 30, 1916
- Country: United States
- Languages: Silent film English intertitles

Prize Winners is a 1916 American silent comedy film featuring Oliver Hardy.

== Plot ==
This plot summary comes from The Moving Picture World for December 2, 1916:

When Babe and Billy are released from the county jail where they were serving sentences for chicken stealing, they resolve that In the future they will work honestly for a lhing. However, they are not wonders at keeping their minds on work, for the first job they secure is that of inspectors of the beer at a local brewery. All that they know of inspecting beer is to sample it, and after they have sampled it for a few hours, they couldn't even see the buildings, so, of course, when the boss comes around, they lose their positions.

The question of food now beset the Babe and Billy, so to ease their famished stomachs they enter Lady Kate's house where a big masquerade ball is in progress. Finding their way into the cloak rooms they steal everything that they see, but once having secured the silver and other trinkets, they discover that their exit Is blocked by the servants, who Insist on mistaking them for guests. Forced into the ball room, they are seen by Lady Kate, who Immediately gives to them the prize ftr being the best masqued persons In the room.

After basking for a few moments in the sunny smiles of Lady Kate, Babe decides that honesty is the best policy, so he catches the unwilling Billy and forces him to give up all the stolen jewelry. Babe leaves it on the table for Lady Kate, and with his disgruntled pal leaves the house before their deception is discovered.

== Cast ==
- Oliver Hardy as Babe (as Babe Hardy)
- Kate Price as Lady Kate
- Billy Ruge as Billy

== See also ==
- List of American films of 1916
- Oliver Hardy filmography
