= The Latest from Paris =

1928 film

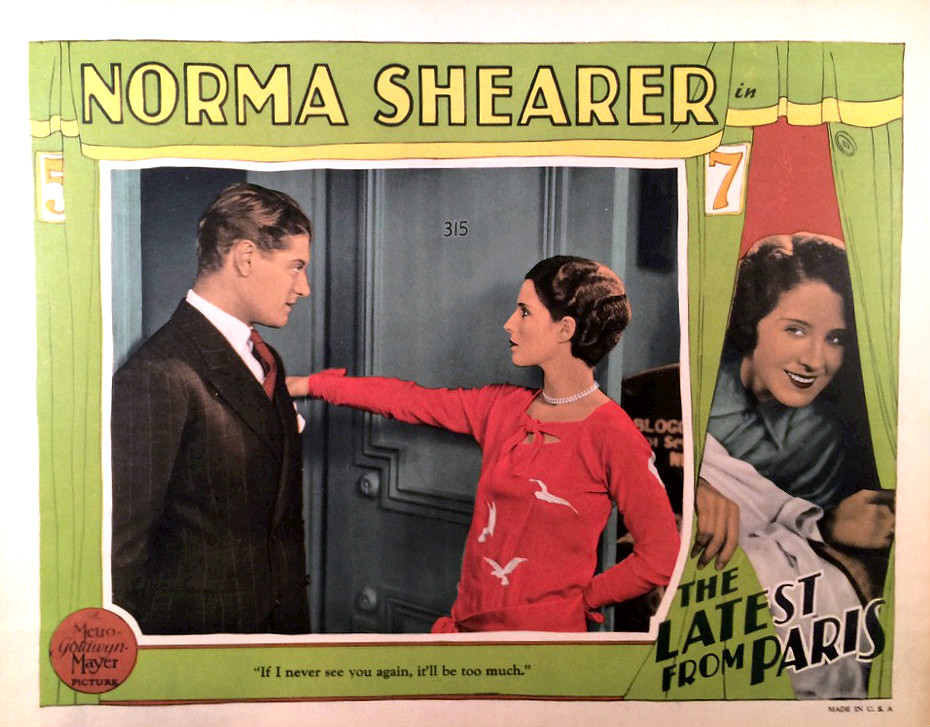
- Lobby card
- Directed by: Sam Wood
- Screenplay by: Joseph Farnham; A. P. Younger
- Story by: A. P. Younger
- Starring: Norma Shearer; George Sidney; Ralph Forbes; Tenen Holtz; William Bakewell
- Cinematography: William H. Daniels
- Edited by: Basil Wrangell
- Production company: Metro-Goldwyn-Mayer
- Distributed by: Metro-Goldwyn-Mayer
- Release date: February 4, 1928
- Running time: 80 minutes
- Country: United States
- Language: Silent (English intertitles)

The Latest from Paris is a 1928 American silent romantic drama film directed by Sam Wood and written by Joseph Farnham and A. P. Younger. The film stars Norma Shearer, George Sidney, Ralph Forbes, Tenen Holtz, and William Bakewell. The film was released on February 4, 1928, by Metro-Goldwyn-Mayer.

== Cast ==
- Norma Shearer as Ann Dolan
- George Sidney as Sol Blogg
- Ralph Forbes as Joe Adams
- Tenen Holtz as Abe Littauer
- William Bakewell as Bud Dolan
- Margaret Landis as Louise Martin
- Bert Roach as Bert Blevins
- Ethel M. Jackson
- Della Peterson

== Preservation status ==
- The film survives, preserved by MGM, with only reel 4 missing.
