= Killing Horace =

1914 film

- Starring: Fatty Arbuckle
- Release date: October 1, 1914
- Country: United States
- Languages: Silent; English intertitles

Killing Horace is a 1914 American short comedy film starring Fatty Arbuckle.

== Cast ==
- Roscoe "Fatty" Arbuckle
- Charles Murray

== See also ==
- List of American films of 1914
- Fatty Arbuckle filmography
