= The Cohens and Kellys =

1926 film by Harry A. Pollard

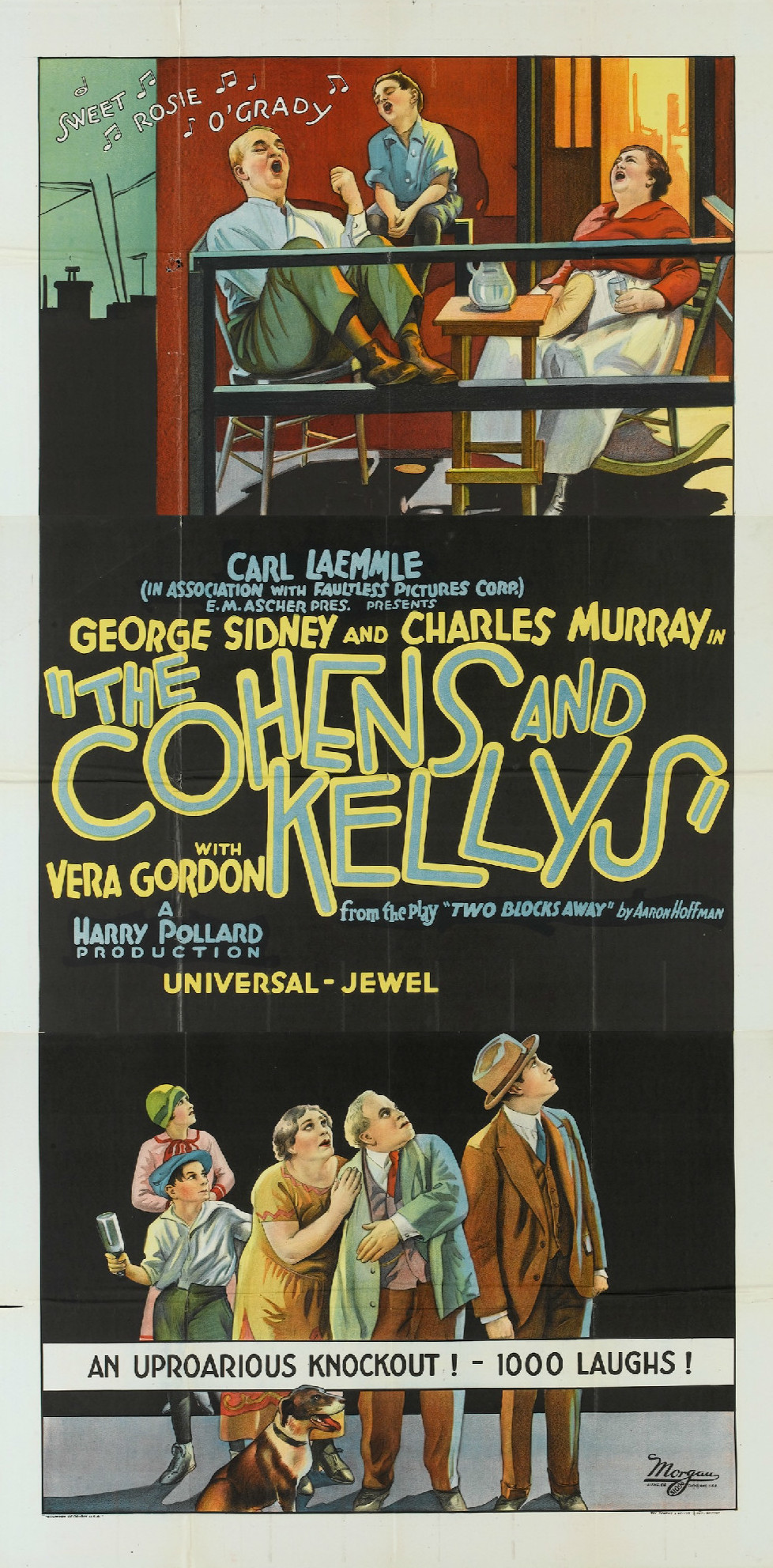
- Poster
- Directed by: Harry A. Pollard
- Written by: Alfred A. Cohn; Aaron Hoffman (play Two Blocks Away); Harry A. Pollard
- Produced by: E.M. Asher; Edward Small
- Starring: Charles Murray; George Sidney; Kate Price; Jason Robards Sr.
- Cinematography: Charles Stumar
- Distributed by: Universal Pictures
- Release date: February 28, 1926
- Running time: 80 minutes
- Country: United States
- Language: Silent (English intertitles)

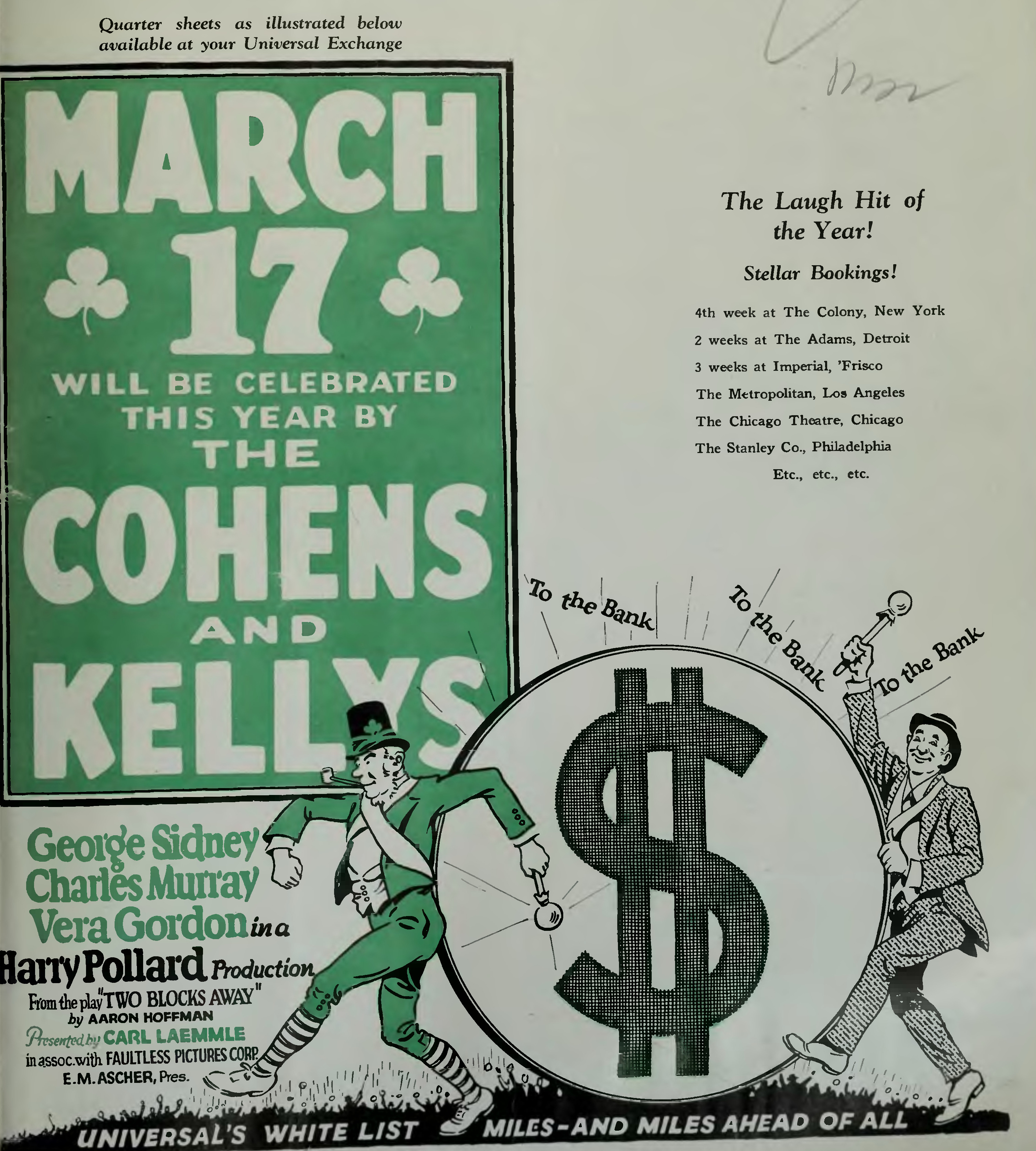
The Cohens and Kellys ad in The Film Daily, 1926

The Cohens and Kellys is a 1926 American silent comedy film directed by Harry A. Pollard and starring Charles Murray, George Sidney, Kate Price, and Jason Robards Sr. The film is the first of the Cohens and Kellys film serials. The film is perhaps best known today as the subject of Nichols v. Universal Pictures Corp., a copyright infringement case, in which Judge Learned Hand articulated the doctrine that copyright protection does not cover the characteristics of stock characters in a story.

== Plot ==
As articulated in the Nichols case,

The Cohens and The [sic] Kellys presents two families, Jewish and Irish, living side by side in the poorer quarters of New York in a state of perpetual enmity. The wives in both cases are still living, and share in the mutual animosity, as do two small sons, and even the respective dogs. The Jews have a daughter, the Irish a son; the Jewish father is in the clothing business; the Irishman is a policeman. The children are in love with each other, and secretly marry, apparently after the play opens. The Jew, being in great financial straits, learns from a lawyer that he has fallen heir to a large fortune from a great-aunt, and moves into a great house, fitted luxuriously. Here he and his family live in vulgar ostentation, and here the Irish boy seeks out his Jewish bride, and is chased away by the angry father. The Jew then abuses the Irishman over the telephone, and both become hysterically excited. The extremity of his feelings makes the Jew sick, so that he must go to Florida for a rest, just before which the daughter discloses her marriage to her mother.

On his return, the Jew finds that his daughter has borne a child; at first he suspects the lawyer, but eventually learns the truth and is overcome with anger at such a low alliance. Meanwhile, the Irish family who have been forbidden to see the grandchild, go to the Jew's house, and after a violent scene between the two fathers in which the Jew disowns his daughter, who decides to go back with her husband, the Irishman takes her back with her baby to his own poor lodgings. The lawyer, who had hoped to marry the Jew's daughter, seeing his plan foiled, tells the Jew that his fortune really belongs to the Irishman, who was also related to the dead woman, but offers to conceal his knowledge, if the Jew will share the loot. This the Jew repudiates, and, leaving the astonished lawyer, walks through the rain to his enemy's house to surrender the property. He arrives in great dejection, tells the truth, and abjectly turns to leave. A reconciliation ensues, the Irishman agreeing to share with him equally. The Jew shows some interest in his grandchild, though this is at most a minor motive in the reconciliation, and the curtain falls while the two are in their cups, the Jew insisting that in the firm name for the business, which they are to carry on jointly, his name shall stand first.

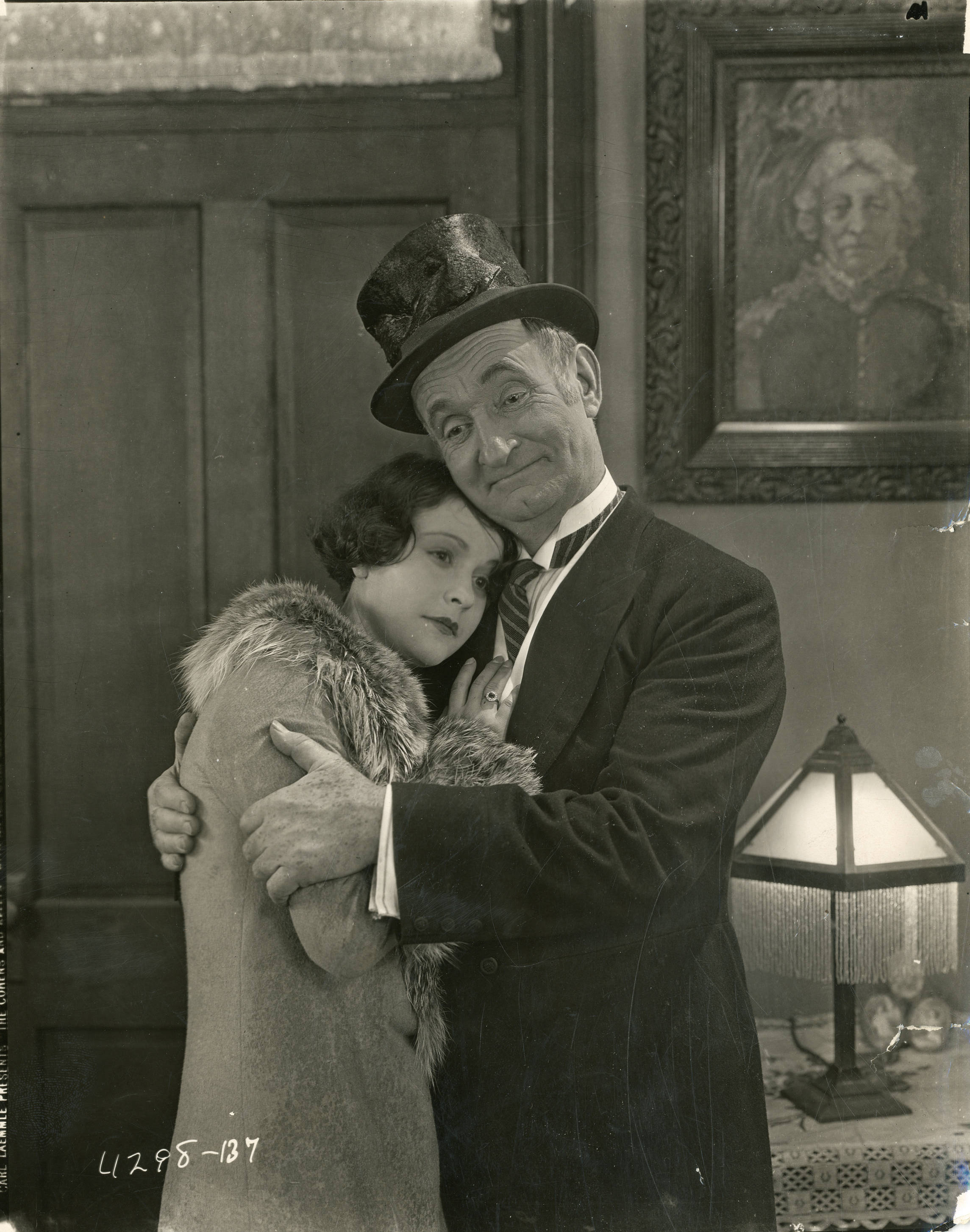
Charles Murray and Olive Hasbrouck

The characters were similar to those in the Nichols play, Abie's Irish Rose which was made into a film in 1928 and in 1946.

== Cast ==
- Charles Murray as Patrick Kelly
- George Sidney as Jacob Cohen
- Vera Gordon as Mrs. Cohen
- Kate Price as Mrs. Kelly
- Jason Robards Sr. as Tim Kelly
- Olive Hasbrouck as Nannie Cohen
- Nat Carr as Milton J. Katz
- Robert Gordon as Sammy Cohen
- Mickey Bennett as Terence Kelly
- Claude Payton as Minor Role (uncredited)
- Mack Swain as Minor Role (uncredited)

== Preservation status ==
In addition to a worn Universal Show-at-Home copy, the film exists in two film archives, Cinematheque Royale de Belgique in Brussels and the Museum of Modern Art in New York. An excellent print with French and Dutch intertitles, with English ones apparently overlaid, was screened on April 20, 2016, at the Museum of Jewish Heritage in Manhattan. As French and Dutch are the official languages of bi-lingual Belgium, this undoubtedly was the print just referenced in an archive.

== Related films ==
The Cohens and Kellys was the first in a series of films featuring characters from the Cohen and Kelly families. It was followed by The Cohens and the Kellys in Paris (1928), The Cohens and Kellys in Atlantic City (1929), The Cohens and the Kellys in Scotland (1930), The Cohens and Kellys in Africa (1930), The Cohens and Kellys in Hollywood (1932), and The Cohens and Kellys in Trouble (1933).

It was an early production of Edward Small.
