= The Auctioneer (film) =

1927 film by Alfred E. Green

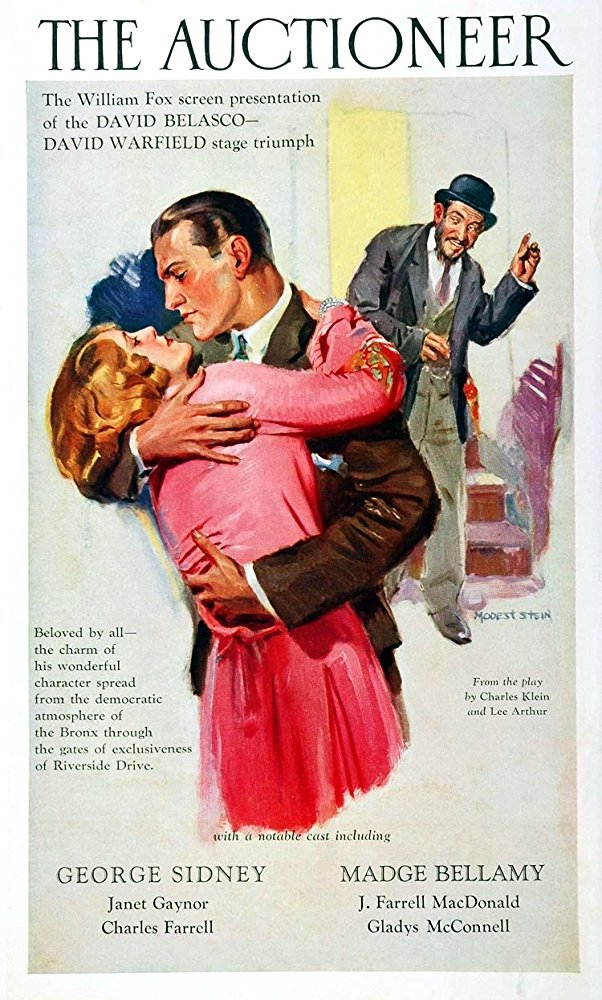
- Directed by: Alfred E. Green
- Written by: Lee Arthur (play); Charles Klein (play); Gordon Rigby (novel); John Stone
- Starring: George Sidney; Marian Nixon; Gareth Hughes
- Cinematography: George Schneiderman
- Production company: Fox Film
- Distributed by: Fox Film
- Release date: January 16, 1927
- Running time: 60 minutes
- Country: United States
- Languages: Silent; English intertitles

The Auctioneer is a 1927 American silent comedy drama film directed by Alfred E. Green and starring George Sidney, Marian Nixon and Gareth Hughes. It was originally planned for Janet Gaynor and Charles Farrell to appear in supporting roles in the film, before both had become stars by that point and other actors were cast. The film was adapted from a 1901 David Belasco stage play of the same name which starred David Warfield.

== Premise ==
Simon Levi, a Jewish immigrant pawnbroker builds up a successful business. His daughter Ruth marries stockbroker Richard Eagan. They are swindled by stockbroker Paul Groode, and forced to labor in the streets to make financial ends meet. Eventually, they achieve retribution against Groode and the movie ends happily for the stockbrokers.

== Cast ==
- George Sidney as Simon Levi
- Marian Nixon as Ruth Levi
- Gareth Hughes as Richard Eagan
- Doris Lloyd as Esther Levi
- Ward Crane as Paul Groode
- Sammy Cohen as Mo
- Claire McDowell as Mrs. Tim Eagan

== Release ==
The film was a serious financial disappointment for the Fox Film company. Made on a budget of $304,000, it took $317,000 worldwide which led to a $106,000 loss once distribution cost are factored in. This was the worst performance by a Fox film that year.

== Reception ==
The Film Daily wrote, "The David Belasco stage play became famous more for the acting of David Warfield than for the importance of the play itself and so the picture becomes entertaining because of the characterization of George Sidney rather than for the story it tells. The theme is slight and of the familiar Abie's Irish Rose variety. But Sidney's fine acting, his typical Jewish humor, plus a quantity of first class comedy incident, makes the picture satisfying. The introduction of the kangaroo offers one of the best laugh sequences of the picture. There is the usual heart interest twist and the happy ending."

Moving Picture World said, "So far as the plot interest is concerned it is considerably drawn out and moves forward rather slowly. More emphasis has been placed on the comedy but it is principally on the characterization of George Sidney that the audience appeal depends, and he certainly gives an excellent performance... This simple little story is rich in human interest and emotional appeal and George Sidney gives a performance that alternately plays upon the emotions and keeps the spectator in smiles."

Variety wrote, "The Auctioneer has enough in its favor to make it a worthwhile major house booking. It is a wholesome picture, has comedy and pathos. Photographically it is splendid [...] Sidney stands out all the way and the continuity gets a gouge here and there to permit him a few extra comedy bits. The theme is deftly handled".

Writing for Chicago Daily Tribune, Mae Tinee wrote, "The Auctioneer is a homely, heartsome picture that will linger pleasantly in your memory" and commented that a fighting kangaroo was the funniest thing in the film.

A review in the Woodward Daily Press of Woodward, Oklahoma said, "Alfred E. Green, who directed the production, took advantage of every opportunity to make the picture more life-like and human, at the same time losing none of the spirit of the original play. It is, according to advance reports, one of the best pictures of its kind ever produced and promises to create as big a sensation as the play".

== Preservation ==
The Auctioneer is currently presumed lost. In February of 2021, the film was cited by the National Film Preservation Board on their Lost U.S. Silent Feature Films list.

== Bibliography ==
- Solomon, Aubrey. The Fox Film Corporation, 1915-1935: A History and Filmography. McFarland, 2011.
