= Give and Take (film) =

1928 lost American film

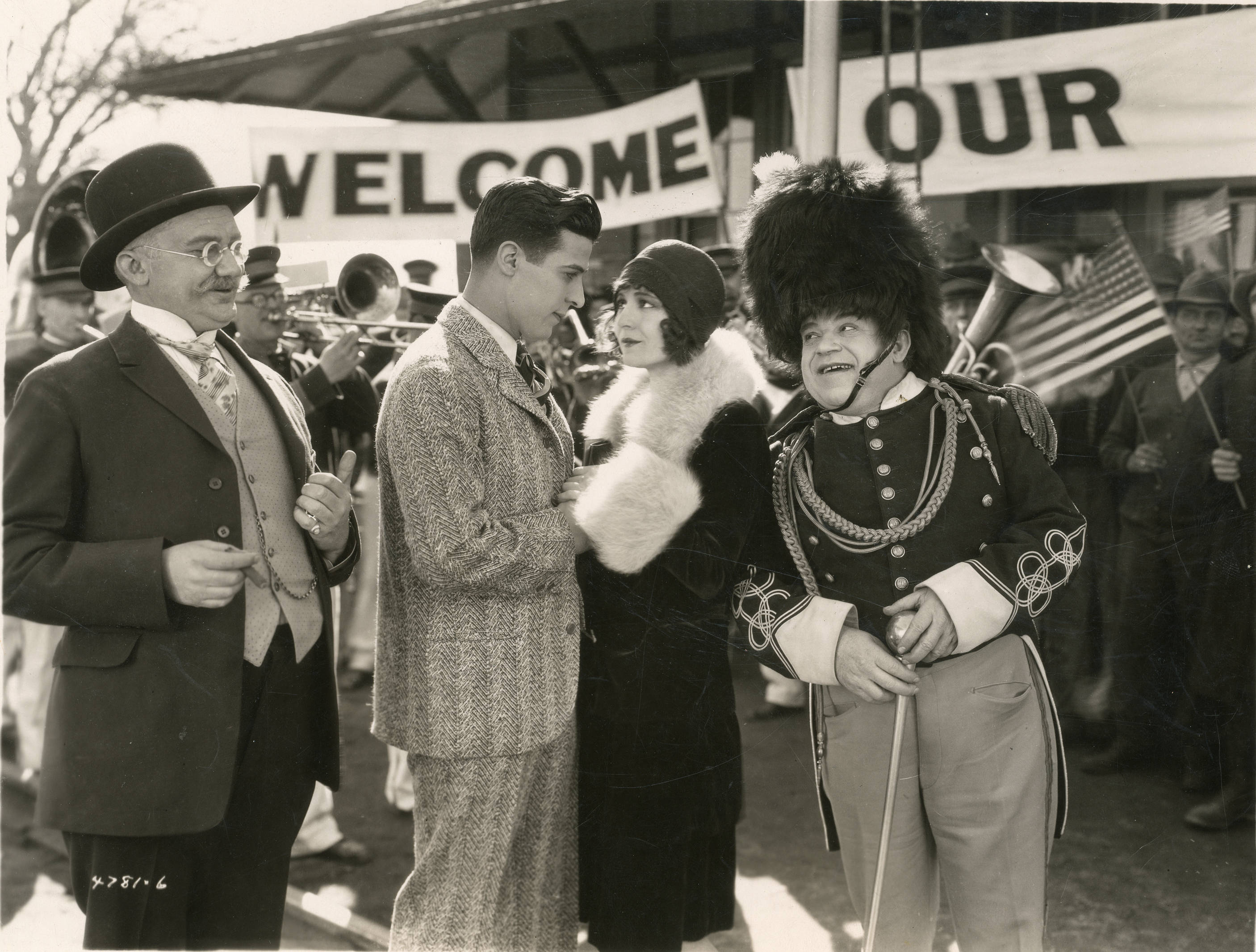
- Film still
- Directed by: William Beaudine
- Written by: Harvey F. Thew; Albert DeMond
- Based on: Give and Take by Aaron Hoffman
- Starring: Jean Hersholt; George Sidney
- Cinematography: Charles Van Enger
- Distributed by: Universal Pictures
- Release date: December 23, 1928
- Running time: 70 minutes
- Country: United States
- Language: Sound (Part-Talkie)

Give and Take is a 1928 American sound part-talkie comedy film directed by William Beaudine. It was Universal's second sound film.

== Plot ==
John Bauer (Jean Hersholt), a self-made owner of a successful fruit canning plant, has dedicated his life to building the business—not for wealth alone, but for the future of his beloved son, Jack Bauer Jr. (George J. Lewis), who is just returning home from college. Bauer, proud of Jack's education and eager for him to follow in his footsteps, brings the company band to the train station to welcome him. Alongside them are John's longtime friend and factory foreman, Albert Kruger (George Sidney), and Kruger's daughter Marian (Sharon Lynn), who works as John's secretary and is secretly Jack's sweetheart.

At the factory, the youthful and idealistic Jack wastes no time unveiling his ambitious vision: a bold new “Industrial Democracy” plan in which workers will share in profits and participate in management decisions. The workers, not entirely sure what it all means, are swept up in Jack's enthusiasm. Kruger, both proud and hopeful, is chosen as their spokesman.

The next day, Kruger presents the employees’ new constitution to John Bauer and asks him to sign it. John is stunned. He refuses—angrily—and a fierce confrontation nearly erupts. Kruger finally reveals that Jack is behind the plan. John is crushed, feeling betrayed by his son and friend. When Kruger then leads the workers in shutting down the machinery for the first time in thirty years, John, broken-hearted, signs the agreement.

But greater troubles loom. A $25,000 note Bauer owes the local bank is about to come due, and the ruthless bank president, Drum (Sam Hardy), refuses to grant an extension. Intent on acquiring the factory himself, Drum seizes Bauer's car and makes arrangements to take his home. He tempts John with a deal: sell the company's trademark to an outside competitor and escape ruin. Defeated, John signs.

Then, out of the blue, a mysterious entrepreneur named Craig arrives (Rhoda Cross as Nancy appears in this subplot). Claiming to be an independent financier launching a door-to-door food distribution empire to challenge the food trust, Craig offers a generous seven-year purchase contract for the plant's entire output. Energized and hopeful again, John departs on a fruit-buying expedition, instructing Jack and Kruger not to contact him as he'll be constantly on the move.

Disaster follows swiftly: two men arrive at the plant claiming Craig is an escaped lunatic from an asylum. Alarmed, Jack and Kruger shut down operations. They're unable to pay workers, and the business teeters on collapse.

John returns two weeks later—just as unrest is boiling over among the workers. As he reels from what he believes is betrayal and fraud, Craig reappears. John and Kruger try to flee—but Craig calmly produces court documents proving his sanity. Kruger looks out the window and sees trucks labeled Craig's Retail Stores lined up, fulfilling the contract. Realizing they misjudged him, Bauer, Kruger, and Jack embrace the new model of business.

With Jack and Marian now engaged, and the company saved by the very Industrial Democracy John once feared, the factory stands as a model of modern cooperation and vision.

== Cast ==
- Jean Hersholt as Factory owner, John Bauer
- George Sidney as Plant Foreman
- George J. Lewis as 'Jack' Bauer Jr.
- Sharon Lynn as Foreman's Daughter
- Sam Hardy as Industrialist
- Rhoda Cross as Nancy
- Charles Hill Mailes as Drumm (credited as Charles Mailes)
- Leo Bates as Undetermined Secondary Role (uncredited)
- Frances Dare as Undetermined Secondary Role (uncredited)
- Fred Farrell as Undetermined Secondary Role (uncredited)
- Billy Franey as Undetermined Secondary Role (uncredited)
- Henry Murdock as Undetermined Secondary Role (uncredited)
- William Orlamond as Undetermined Secondary Role (uncredited)
- Betty Welsh as Undetermined Secondary Role (uncredited)

== Music ==
The film featured a theme song entitled "Give And Take" which was composed by Dave Dreyer, Maceo Pinkard, and Josef Cherniavsky.

== Preservation ==
With no prints of Give and Take located in any film archives, it is a lost film.

== See also ==
- List of early sound feature films (1926–1929)
