= Kate Price =

Irish-American actress (1872–1943)

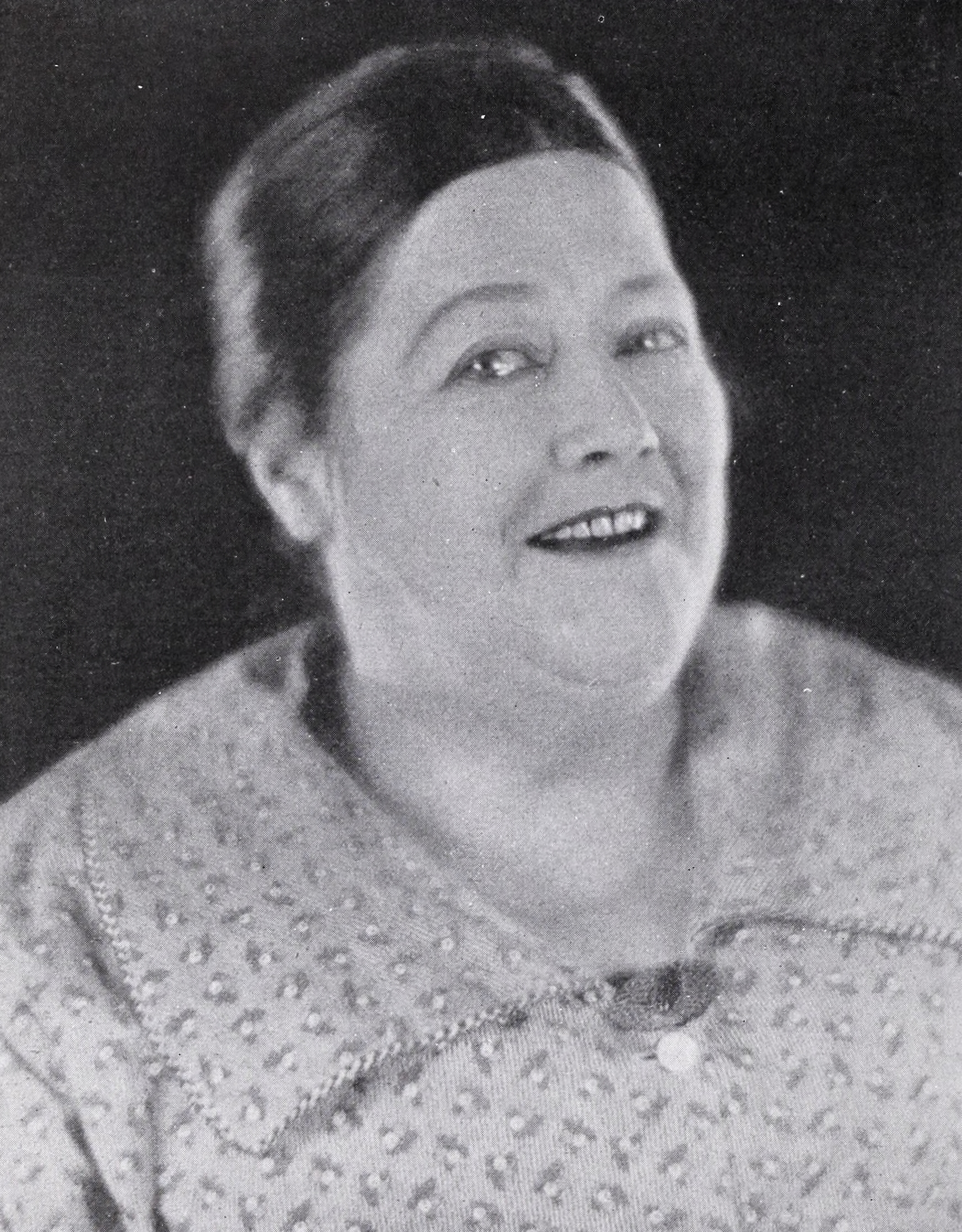
- Price in 1925
- Born: Katherine Duffy; 13 February 1872; Cork, Ireland
- Died: 4 January 1943 (aged 70); Woodland Hills, Los Angeles, California, U.S.
- Resting place: Calvary Cemetery, East Los Angeles, California, U.S.
- Occupation: Actress
- Years active: 1890–1937
- Spouse: Joseph Price Ludwig (m. 1893; died 1913)
- Children: 1
- Relatives: Jack Duffy (brother); Mary Charleson (niece)

Katherine Duffy (13 February 1872 – 4 January 1943), known professionally as Kate Price, was an Irish-American actress. She is known for playing the role of Mrs. Kelly in the comedy series The Cohens and Kellys, made by Universal Pictures between 1926 and 1932. Price appeared in 296 movies from 1910 to 1937.

== Career ==
Price was born in Cork, Ireland and immigrated to the United States with her family in 1881. Her brother was actor Jack Duffy. She began her stage and vaudeville career with her German-American husband, actor Joseph Price Ludwig, in 1890. Price's motion picture career began with the old Vitagraph Studios in New York City in 1902. She acted with movie stars such as Flora Finch, Douglas Fairbanks, John Bunny, Buster Keaton, and Mary Pickford. She was paired with Oliver Hardy for 14 films produced at the Vim Comedy Company in Jacksonville, Florida.

In 1917, Price went to Hollywood. She had parts in The Sea Tiger (1927), The Godless Girl (1929), and Reaching for the Moon (1930). Her final MGM feature was Have a Heart (1934). After making Easy Living and Live, Love and Learn (both released in 1937), she retired.

== Death ==
Price died at age 70 at the Motion Picture Country Home, Woodland Hills. Funeral services were held at St. Theresa's Church with interment in Calvary Cemetery.

== Partial filmography ==
- Her Crowning Glory (1911)
- Lady Godiva (1911)
- All for a Girl (1912)
- One Can't Always Tell (1913)
- Jerry's Mother-In-Law (1913)
- A Million Bid (1914)
- Bringing Up Father (1915)
- The Waiters' Ball (1916)
- A Maid to Order (1916)
- Twin Flats (1916)
- A Warm Reception (1916)
- Pipe Dreams (1916)
- Mother's Child (1916)
- Prize Winners (1916)
- The Guilty Ones (1916)
- He Winked and Won (1916)
- Fat and Fickle (1916)
- The Boycotted Baby (1917)
- Humdrum Brown (1918)
- Good Night, Nurse! (1918)
- The Ghost of Rosy Taylor (1918)
- Arizona (1918)
- Love (1919)
- Dinty (1920)
- The Figurehead (1920)
- That Girl Montana (1921)
- The Other Woman (1921)
- The New Teacher (1922)
- My Wife's Relations (1922)
- A Dangerous Game (1922)
- Flesh and Blood (1922)
- Paid Back (1922)
- Come on Over (1922) as Delia Morahan
- Broken Hearts of Broadway (1923)
- The Dangerous Maid (1923)
- Enemies of Children (1923)
- The Near Lady (1923)
- Good-By Girls! (1923)
- Wolf Tracks (1923)
- Fools Highway (1924)
- Another Man's Wife (1924)
- Riders Up (1924)
- The Sea Hawk (1924)
- The Wife of the Centaur (1924)
- Passion's Pathway (1924)
- The Tornado (1924)
- Seven Chances (1925)
- The Sporting Venus (1925)
- The Man Without a Conscience (1925)
- The Desert Flower (1925)
- His People (1925)
- The Goose Woman (1925)
- The Unchastened Woman (1925)
- Sally, Irene and Mary (1925)
- The Perfect Clown (1925)
- The Arizona Sweepstakes (1926)
- Memory Lane (1926)
- The Beautiful Cheat (1926)
- Paradise (1926)
- The Third Degree (1926)
- Frisco Sally Levy (1927)
- Mountains of Manhattan (1927)
- Quality Street (1927)
- Mad Hour (1928)
- Show Girl (1928)
- Thanks for the Buggy Ride (1928)
- The Cohens and the Kellys in Paris (1928)
- The Cohens and the Kellys in Atlantic City (1929)
- Two Weeks Off (1929)
- Linda (1929)
- The Cohens and the Kellys in Scotland (1930)
- Shadow Ranch (1932)
- Ladies of the Jury (1932)
- Have a Heart (1934)
