= The Cohens and Kellys in Hollywood =

1932 film

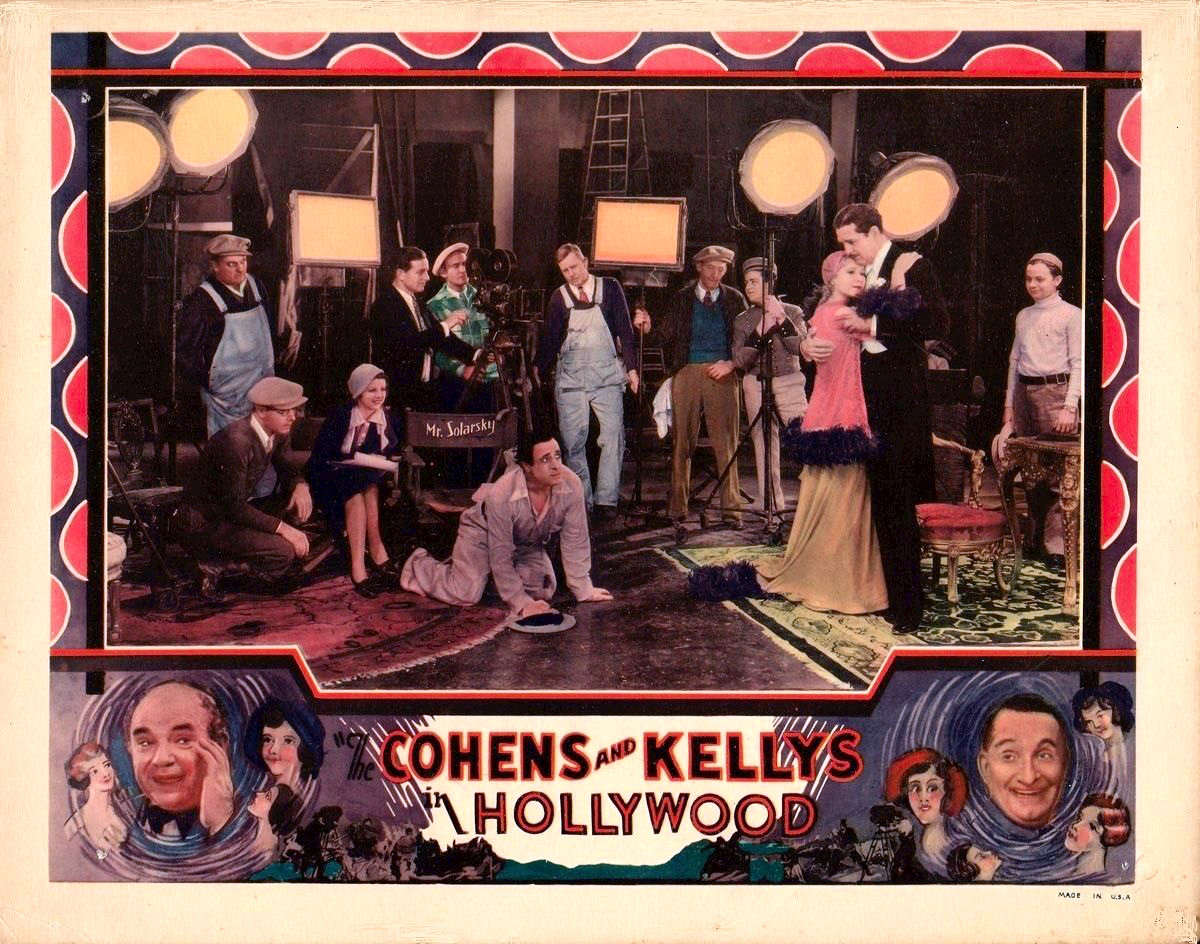
- US lobby card
- Directed by: John Francis Dillon
- Written by: Howard J. Green
- Produced by: Carl Laemmle Jr. Stanley Bergerman
- Starring: George Sidney; Charles Murray; June Clyde; Norman Foster; Esther Howard; Emma Dunn
- Cinematography: Jerome Ash
- Edited by: Harry S. Webb
- Production company: Universal Pictures
- Distributed by: Universal Pictures
- Release date: March 28, 1932
- Running time: 75 minutes
- Country: United States
- Language: English

The Cohens and Kellys in Hollywood is a 1932 American pre-Code comedy film directed by John Francis Dillon and written by Howard J. Green. The film stars George Sidney, Charles Murray, June Clyde, Norman Foster, Esther Howard, and Emma Dunn. Boris Karloff and Tom Mix both appeared as themselves in cameos. The film was released on March 28, 1932, by Universal Pictures.

== Plot ==
The Cohen family and the Kelly family both find success in Hollywood. They become competitive, trying to one-up each other. In the end, they return to their mid-western homes, making up along the way.

== Cast ==
- George Sidney as Sidney Nathan Cohen
- Charles Murray as Michael Kelly
- June Clyde as Kitty Kelly
- Norman Foster as Maurice Cohen
- Esther Howard as Mrs. Maggie Kelly
- Emma Dunn as Mrs. Sarah Cohen
- Eileen Percy as Eileen Percy
- Edwin Maxwell as Chauncey Chadwick
- Luis Alberni as Bladimir Petrosky
- John Roche as Gregory Gordon
- Robert Greig as Chesterfield
- Dorothy Christy as Mrs. Chauncey Chadwick
- Harry Barris as Pianist
- Frank Albertson as Frank Albertson
- Lew Ayres as Lew Ayers
- Sidney Fox as Sidney Fox
- Genevieve Tobin as Genevieve Tobin
- Tom Mix as Tom Mix
- Boris Karloff as Boris Karloff
