= Albert DeMond =

American screenwriter

- Born: May 7, 1901; Providence, Rhode Island, United States
- Died: February 20, 1973 (aged 71); Los Angeles, California; United States
- Occupation: Screenwriter
- Years active: 1927–1966

Albert DeMond (May 7, 1901 – February 20, 1973) was an American screenwriter.

== Selected filmography ==
- His Foreign Wife (1927)
- On Your Toes (1927)
- The Fourflusher (1928)
- Phyllis of the Follies (1928)
- How to Handle Women (1928)
- Home, James (1928)
- Give and Take (1928)
- The Cohens and the Kellys in Atlantic City (1929)
- Skinner Steps Out (1929)
- The Cohens and the Kellys in Scotland (1930)
- The Unshod Maiden (1932)
- Above the Clouds (1933)
- Shadows of Sing Sing (1933)
- Take the Stand (1934)
- No Ransom (1934)
- Storm Over the Andes (1935)
- Unknown Woman (1935)
- The Perfect Clue (1935)
- School for Girls (1935)
- Passport to Alcatraz (1940)
- Fugitive from a Prison Camp (1940)
- The Great Swindle (1941)
- Call of the South Seas (1944)
- Madonna of the Desert (1948)
- The Red Menace (1949)
- Prince of the Plains (1949)
- Alias the Champ (1949)
- Trial Without Jury (1950)
- Million Dollar Pursuit (1951)
- Marshal of Cedar Rock (1953)

== Bibliography ==
- Martin, Len D. The Republic Pictures Checklist: Features, Serials, Cartoons, Short Subjects and Training Films of Republic Pictures Corporation, 1935-1959. McFarland, 1998.
