= Humoresque (disambiguation) =

Humoresque is a genre of Romantic music.

Humoresque or Humoreske may also refer to:

- Humoresque (literature), humorous short story
- Humoresque (1919 short story) by Fannie Hurst
- Humoresque (1920 film)
- Humoresque (1946 film)
- "Humoresque" (Jack White song), from his 2018 album Boarding House Reach
- Humoresques (Dvořák), a piano cycle by Antonín Dvořák
- Humoreske (Schumann)
- Humoresker (Grieg)
- Numorske (1903) by Ottorino Respighi
- Humoreske by Max Reger
- Humoreske by Cyrillus Kreek
- Humoreske in List of compositions by Alexander von Zemlinsky
- Six Humoresques

== See also ==
- Humor Risk
