= Bobby Connelly =

American actor

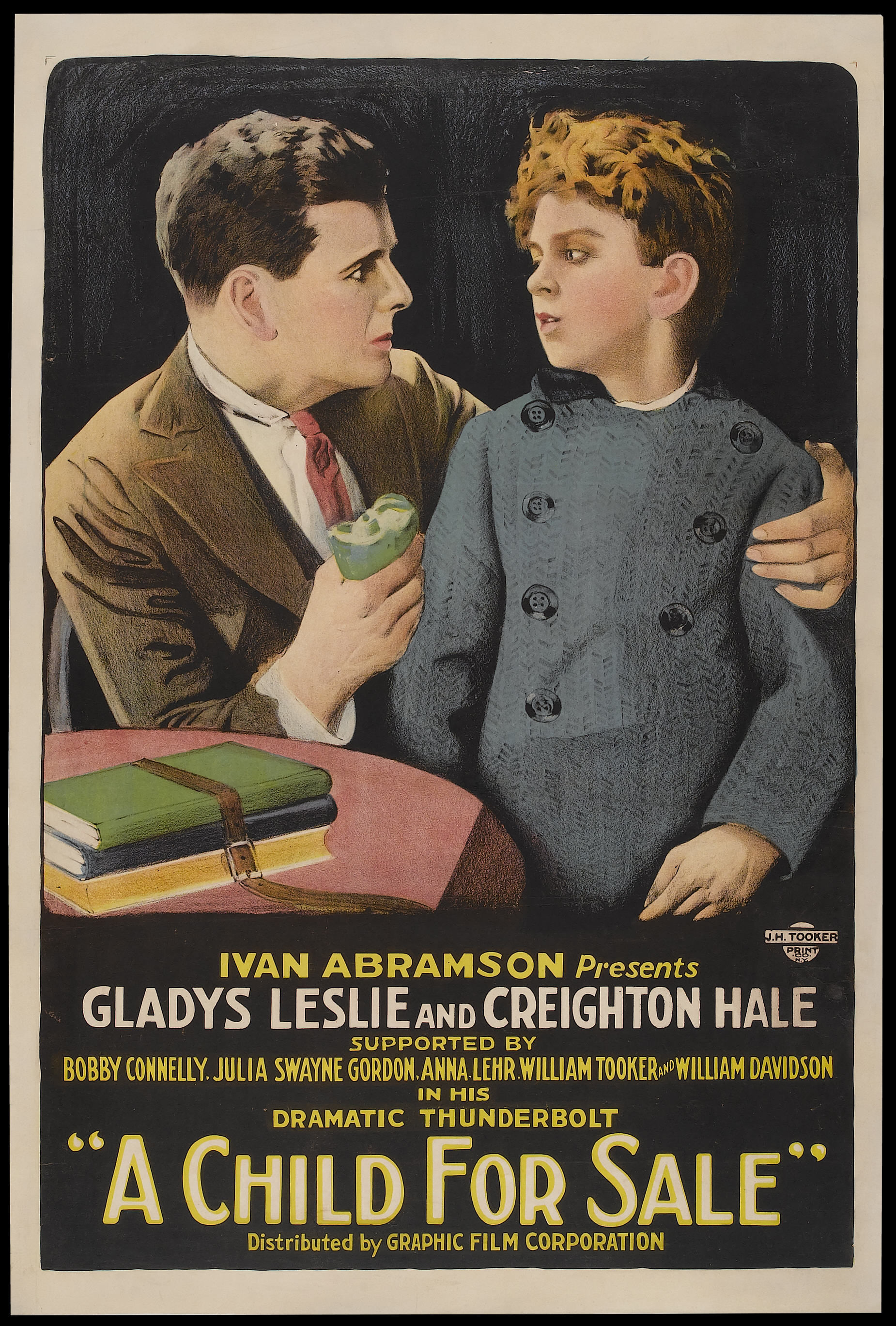
- Bobby Connelly and Creighton Hale(l). 1920.
- Born: Robert Joseph Connelly; April 4, 1909; Brooklyn, New York, U.S.
- Died: July 5, 1922 (aged 13); Lynbrook, Nassau County, New York, U.S.
- Occupation: Actor
- Years active: 1913–1922

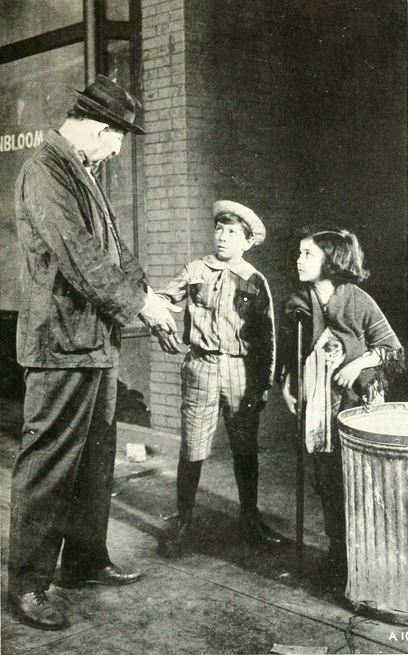
L-R: Dore Davidson, Bobby Connelly with Miriam Battista in Humoresque (1920 film)

Robert Joseph Connelly (April 4, 1909 – July 5, 1922) was an American child actor of silent films. He is one of the first male child stars of American motion pictures beginning his career in 1913 at the age of four.

== Career ==
Connelly's parents were vaudeville performers, and young Connelly began in films with the Kalem company. His sister Helen also had a career as a child actress. In 1914 Connelly switched to Vitagraph Studios, which were based primarily in New York and New Jersey, close to where Connelly and his family lived. He appeared in films with major players of the day, and in 1914–15 portrayed "Sonny Jim" in a series of shorts about the adventures of a young boy.

Connelly in "Sonny Jim" film fragment

In 1917, he got his own series of films with his name in the title to emphasise his star billing. His career pertains primarily with the Vitagraph studios, but occasionally he would appear in other studios' productions, such as Humoresque produced by Paramount Pictures in 1920. Humoresque, a story by Fannie Hurst was a huge hit in 1920 and is one of Connelly's few films to survive.

On stage, Connelly acted in Man and Wife at Proctor's Theater in Yonkers, New York.

== Death ==
In 1917, Connelly was diagnosed with endocarditis. Nevertheless, he was still allowed to keep a heavy work schedule. In 1922, Connelly became ill after completing work on the film Wildness of Youth. He died of bronchitis at his home on July 5, 1922, at the age of 13.

== Selected filmography ==
- Salvation Joan (1916)
- The Suspect (1916)
- A Prince in a Pawnshop (1916)
- Her Right to Live (1917)
- The Seal of Silence (1918)
- Beyond the Law (1918)
- Out of a Clear Sky (1918)
- The Road Through the Dark (1918)
- The Unpardonable Sin (1919)
- A Child for Sale (1920)
- The Flapper (1920)
- Humoresque (1920)
- Other Men's Shoes (1920)
- A Wide Open Town (1922)

== Bibliography ==
- Holmstrom, John. The Moving Picture Boy: An International Encyclopaedia from 1895 to 1995, Norwich, Michael Russell, 1996, p. 39.
