= Poems on the Underground =

London transport literary project

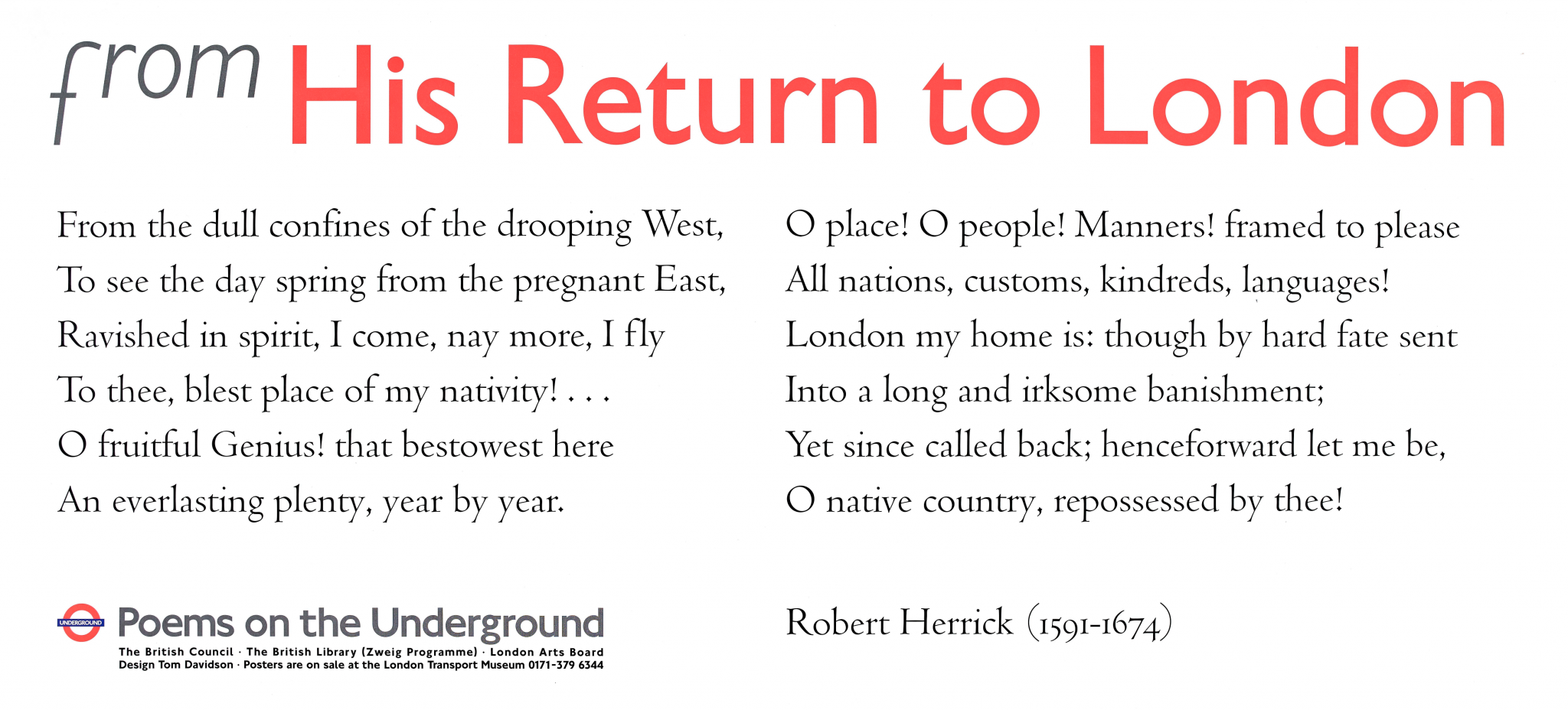
A twelve-line excerpt of Robert Herrick's "His Return to London" used in Poems on the Underground in 1996

Poems on the Underground (POTU) is a project, started in 1986, to bring poetry to a wider audience by displaying short poems on trains across the London Underground. Poems on display are rotated three times a year and include both classic and contemporary works; poems are also occasionally displayed at stations or other locations for special events. The anthology Poems on the Underground, selecting poems displayed over the life of the programme, is reprinted regularly and POTU also produces booklets with themed groups of poems.

== Foundation ==
The Poems on the Underground programme was the idea of three writers, Judith Chernaik, Gerard Benson, and Cicely Herbert, whose aim was to bring poetry to a wider audience. Benson and Herbert were members of the Barrow Poets, a collective who performed poetry and folk music in nontraditional venues; Chernaik was inspired by their work, as well as by a scene in As You Like It where Orlando attaches his love poetry to trees, to propose putting poetry on the London Underground. Chernaik has also noted the project's debt to previous public poetry schemes, such as a set of poems engraved on pavements on the banks of the Thames for the Festival of Britain, and early Underground posters using lines from classic poets. She wrote to London Transport, the precursor to Transport for London (TfL), suggesting that they donate unsold advertising spaces to the project; much to her surprise, they agreed to the proposal and offered to provide half the funding for 1000 spaces if the group would provide the other half.

Chernaik applied to the Arts Council for £3000 to cover the cost of buying the advertising space and designing and printing the posters. While the application was under consideration she was contacted by Claire Tomalin, who told her that Philip Larkin - on the committee reviewing the grants - was concerned that the project was "too left-wing", and suggested Chernaik write to him to clarify that the programme would have no political agenda. The Poems on the Underground archives preserve a letter from Larkin to Chernaik in 1985, after he and the committee had approved the grant, giving good wishes to the fledgling project and expressing his hope that he would see his work included in it. Larkin died that December, so he never saw his poem "The Trees" when it was included in the second set of posters when the project launched the following year.

As the project gathered interest, Faber & Faber offered to design and print the posters at no cost, and Oxford University Press also agreed to provide funds. The first set of five poems were "Up in the Morning Early" by Robert Burns; "The Railway Children" by Seamus Heaney; "Like a Beacon" by Grace Nichols; "Ozymandias" by Percy Bysshe Shelley; and "This Is Just to Say" by William Carlos Williams;

After public enthusiasm for the first batches of poems, Transport for London agreed to quadruple the number of display spaces allocated to the project - at the time this was equivalent to roughly one poem per Tube carriage in service - and to provide them for free.

== The programme ==
=== Train poems ===
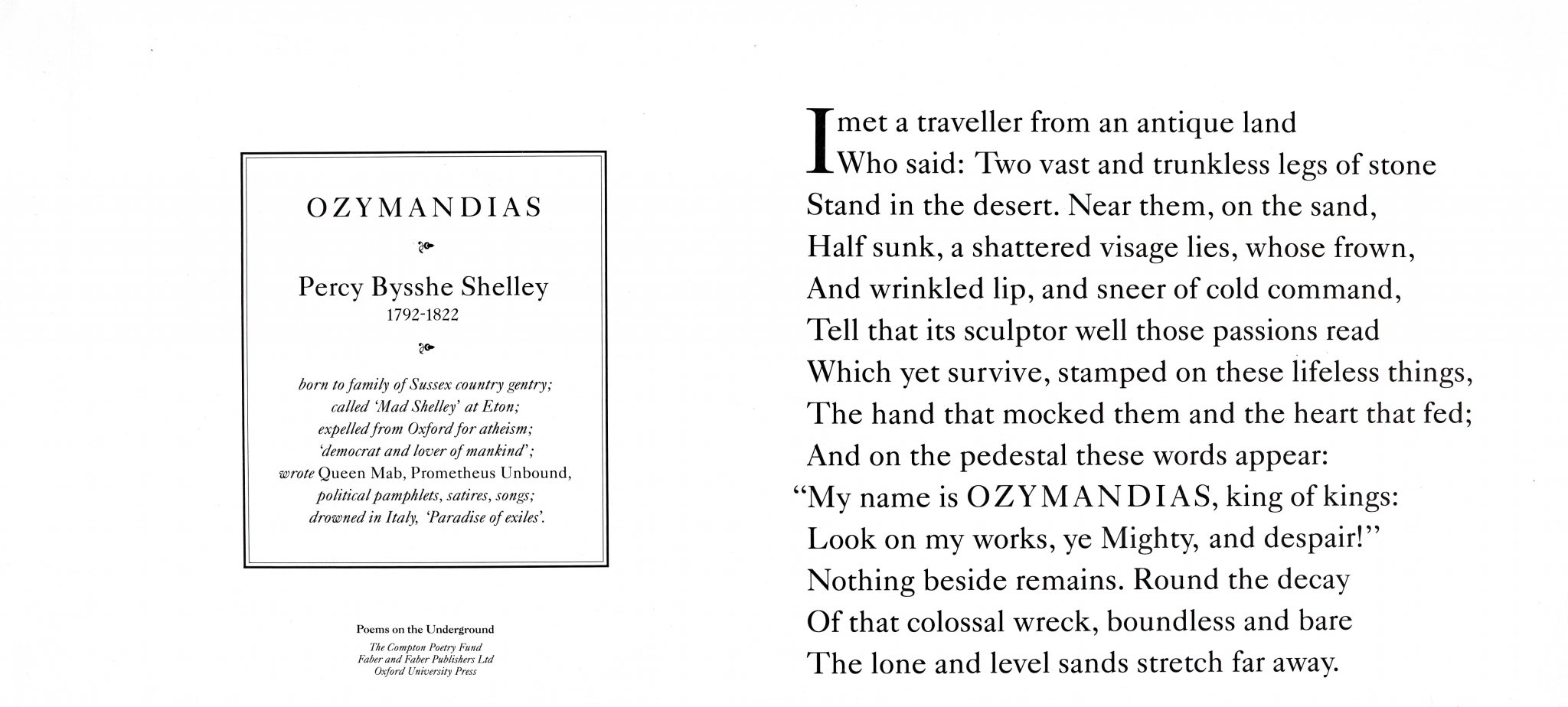
The 1986 poster for Shelley's "Ozymandias", one of the first poems featured by the programme

A series of different poems are displayed at any given time, ranging from classical and historical works by such well-loved poets as Blake, Shakespeare and Shelley, to contemporary and emerging poets from around the world. New sets of poems go on display three times a year, in February, June and October/November. Sets often include a poem or poems for a particular topic or occasion: these include the 150th anniversary of the Underground; the 75th anniversary of Windrush Day; Scottish poetry for Burns Night in 2022; Greek culture and literature; Polish poetry, for the centenary of the birth of Czesław Miłosz; Lithuanian poetry for the centenary of Lithuanian independence; London itself; and the power of the written word.

In 1996, the project held a poetry competition in partnership with the Times Literary Supplement, with three winners being displayed on Tube posters. In 2003, the UK government funded a special set of 25 poems in various languages to celebrate the 30th anniversary of Britain joining the European Union. In 2024 and 2025, sets featured work from winners of the Foyle Young Poets award.

In 2020, with the COVID-19 lockdown in the United Kingdom having reduced the number of Underground journeys to a fraction of normal, POTU launched a website featuring a selection of previously displayed poems. The website was later expanded to include a complete archive of all poems featured since 1986, lists of themed sets, digital copies of the selection booklets distributed for events, and audio recordings. In 2024, the Scottish Poetry Library mounted an exhibition of selected poems from the project's archives.

The posters are designed by Tom Davidson. Where a poem is very short, the extra space is sometimes used for art: a haiku by Kobayashi Issa included in a 2026 set was accompanied by newly commissioned calligraphy of the poem by Yukki Yaura.

Partners for Poems on the Underground include Transport for London, which supports the project through its People and Places unit, the British Council, the British Library (initially through a programme sponsored by the Stefan Zweig Collection), and the Poetry Society.

==== Current editorial process ====
Benson died in 2014, and Herbert stepped back from the project around the same time. Chernaik invited Imtiaz Dharker and George Szirtes to join her on the editorial panel, and the trio remained in charge of selecting the poems as of 2026. The three editors bring poems to meetings and read them to each other, and at each meeting aim to select five or six poems for the next set. Szirtes described his selection criteria as "looking for something that does not make enormous demands of the traveller [...] something that is humane, so people can associate with it, in that they recognise feelings which they might have themselves, and something which once you get into it is bigger than it seems". Only already-published poems are considered; at least two spots in each set are reserved for living poets. According to Dharker, the editors have no other rules about what poems are eligible, barring the need to be short enough to fit on the poster at a readable size.

==== Poems challenged ====
According to Chernaik, a member of Transport for London queried whether the fifteenth-century carol "I have a gentil cock" should be included, due to the double entendre, but dropped the objection after an unspecified newspaper printed it, and the poem was part of a set in 1989. In 1999 Jo Shapcott's poem "Quark" met similar objections due to its use of "bollocks", but also went ahead.

Carl Sandburg's anti-war poem "Grass" was included in the set of poems planned for autumn 2001 as a nod to Remembrance Day that year, but after the September 11 attacks, Chernaik discussed with Transport for London whether it should run. In October that year she mentioned in a Guardian piece that it had been pulled but in the end it was included.

==== In other venues ====
Copies of the posters used on the Underground are made available to libraries, schools, and prisons and are for sale to the general public through the Poetry Society. As of 2026, the possibility of including audio recordings of the poems amongst station announcements had been discussed, but not realised.

Cover art for the tenth edition of the Poems on the Underground anthology

=== Books ===
The first book containing all the featured poems was not published until 1991. Chernaik approached multiple publishers with a proposal for a collection, all of whom rejected the idea. She eventually met Cassell editor Barry Holmes at the launch event for a book on art on the Underground, who accepted the proposal and printed an initial run of 400 copies. The anthology was reprinted and expanded repeatedly, from 100 poems in the first version to 300 in the tenth in 2001, and the various editions had collectively sold more than 250,000 copies by the time of Holmes' death in 2016.

=== Archives ===
In 2024, Poems on the Underground donated the project's archives to Cambridge University Library. The collection includes copies of posters from past rotations of poems, documents related to both the train posters and to other events, and correspondence. The latter set includes letters from many poets whose work appeared in the project including Seamus Heaney, Carol Ann Duffy, Louise Glück, Anne Stevenson, and Philip Larkin.

== Reception ==
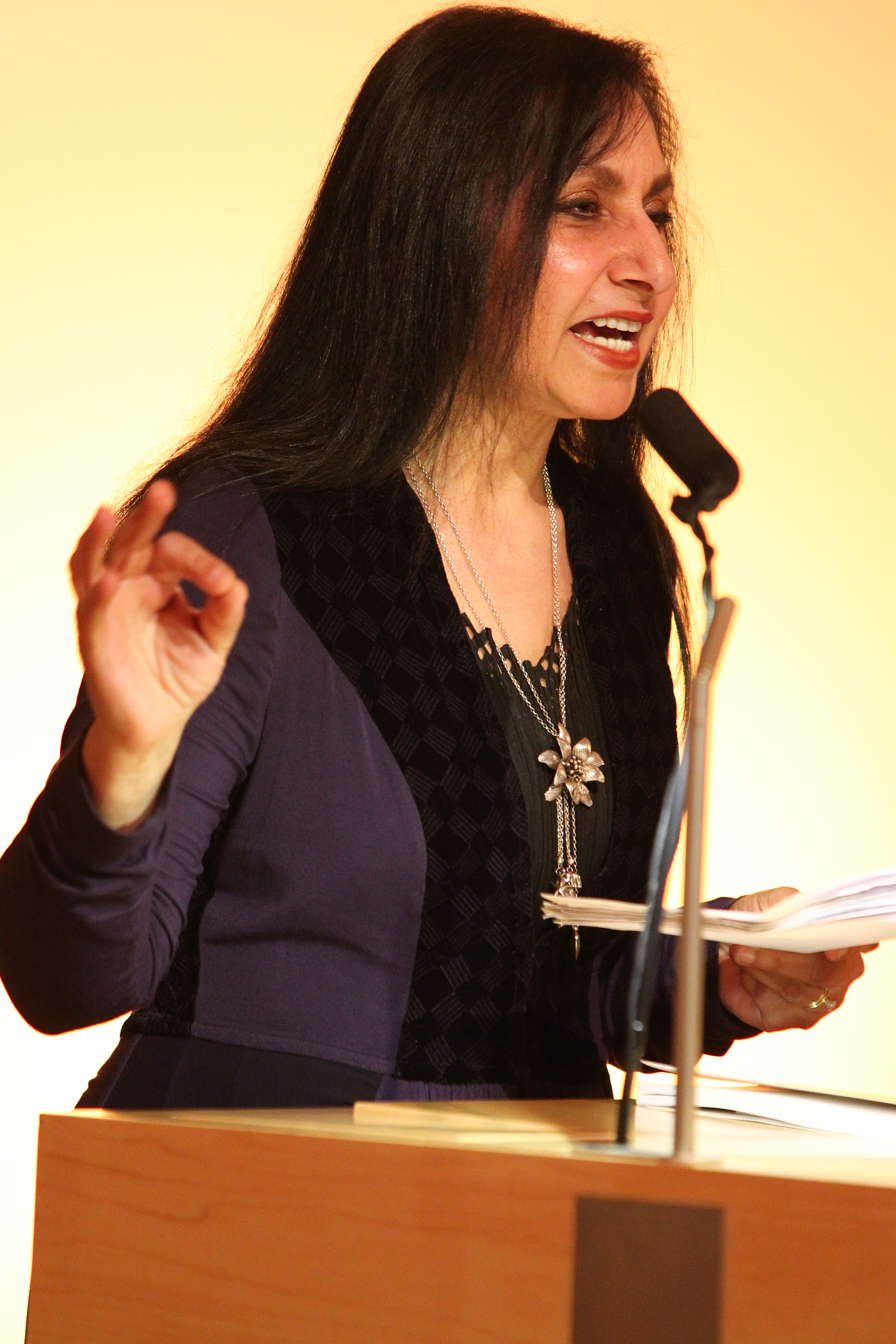
Imtiaz Dharker, one of the project's three current editors

The Poems on the Underground project has been well received by poets, critics and the public, with commentary often citing its importance as public art and as part of the London cultural landscape. Chernaik wrote in 2013 of the "almost universal delight" the project had received in its then 27 years of existence.

Seamus Heaney wrote to Chernaik in 1999 to thank her for the project, which he believed "ha[d] made a difference, I am sure, to the life-worth of poetry for many people". Imtiaz Dharker, who subsequently joined the project's editorial panel, was so taken by seeing a Poems on the Underground poem for the first time - "Everyone Sang", by Siegfried Sassoon - that she missed her stop, and later wrote that, to her, the project represents "the absolute belief in the necessity of poetry, its power in the places where we live and travel every day". Daljit Nagra, who encountered a commuter moved to tears by one of his poems, called the impact of the public poems the "highest compliment" a poet could receive. In 2000, the then-newly appointed Poet Laureate Andrew Motion praised the scheme as a "heartening and daily reminder" of the importance of public literature.

Simon Ray, then the presenter of Poetry Please, praised the project in 1993 specifically for presenting poems without context, which he believed avoided the idea that poetry was "in some insidious way meant to be good for you". The poet and critic Ian Hamilton objected to the project on the same grounds as many praised it, disliking the democratisation, and in his belief dilution, of poetry as an art form.

A 2026 Guardian editorial for Poems on the Underground's fortieth anniversary described it as "as much a part of the contemporary UK cultural landscape as Trafalgar Square’s fourth plinth or the Angel of the North [...] public art at its highest", while Justine Simons, London's then deputy mayor for culture, called the project part of the "familiar furniture" of the city, and Daisy Dunn called the posters "synonymous with London". In 2024 the critic Rachel Cooke deemed the project "among the most important public art of [her] lifetime"; in 2015 Sam Leith described it as "one of the greatest civilising campaigns this capital has ever seen" and Maev Kennedy described it in 2012 as "the most democratic artistic intervention of my lifetime".

=== Academic analysis ===
Robert Crawshaw wrote that the project "was never designed to be politically challenging and rarely if ever is", but considered it unusual among anthology projects in its "deliberate range and diversity, both culturally and temporally".

Julia Forster judged the project as ultimately commercial, noting that the poems themselves become advertisement-like, "lifted out of biographical, geographical and literary context with the only common thread between them being that they are short enough to fit into an advertising space", but praised the way in which readers of the poems are "transported between tube stops into an imagined territory", with the Underground setting "‘invert[ing]’ the relationship between poem and environment": compared to other poems and public art projects inspired by places, the Underground poems make their place (the train) inspiring by their presence.

Frances Causer observed that the irregular distribution of the posters means each poem is a "serendipitous find" even for people who know they exist, adding to the surprise of finding poetry in an unexpected context. Andrew Thacker connected the success of the project to the importance of visual distractions in crowded urban spaces, as the poems draw the eye by providing something to look at that is not advertising or other people.

Poems on the Underground's potential audience - the Underground's entire commuter base - is in the millions, larger than that plausible for any academic publication. Helen Cooper touched briefly on the therefore larger potential for public misunderstanding created by the project's editorial choices, noting that the version of the roundel from Chaucer's Parliament of Fowls used by POTU is only "a conjectural reconstruction". Jane Feaver discovered that the version of John Clare's poem "I am" that she first learned through POTU, though used in several editions of Clare's poetry, is not the original.

=== Projects inspired by POTU ===
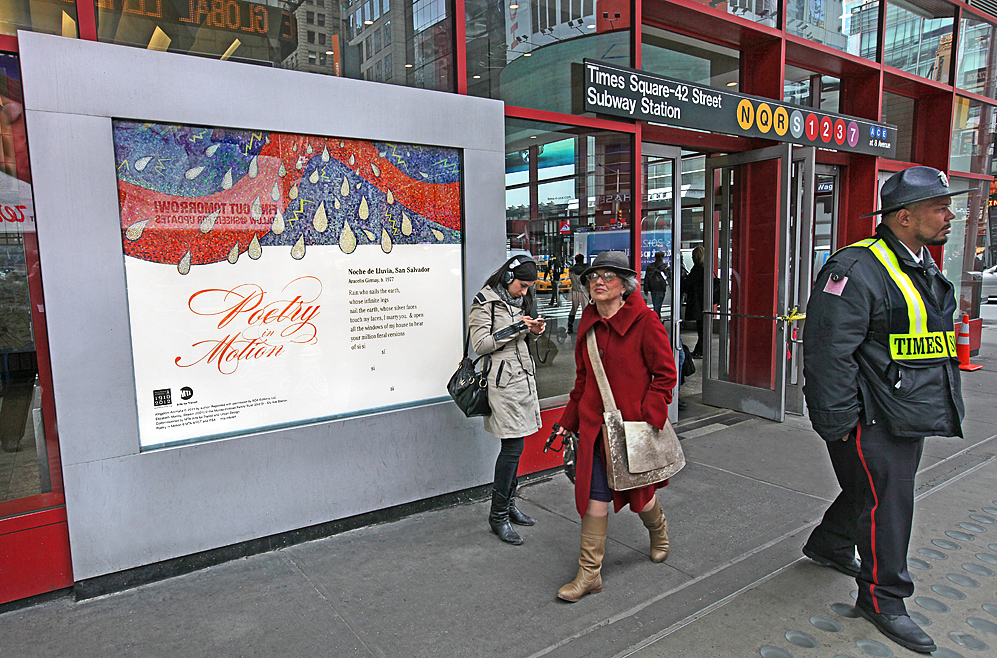
"Noche de Lluvia, San Salvador," by Aracelis Girmay, displayed at Times Square–42nd Street station as part of the Poetry in Motion project in 2012.

==== Other public art programmes ====
The project is credited as an inspiration for similar programmes, temporary or permanent, around the world, including the Poetry in Motion project that spans several US cities; the "Para Leer de Boleto en el Metro" scheme in Mexico City; the WoW (Words on Wheels/Words on the Water) scheme in Sydney; "Poetry on the DART" in Dublin; and other schemes in Paris, Barcelona, Stockholm, Helsinki, St Petersburg, Shanghai, Beijing, Warsaw, Oslo, Moscow, Sao Paulo, Athens, Vienna, and Singapore.

==== Music ====
Thea Musgrave's On the Underground I, II and III, three sets of short choral pieces, use texts previously featured in Poems on the Underground.

In 1996 the Stefan Zweig Series concert programme held a competition for young composers to set texts featured in Poems on the Underground. In 1997 the programme put on another concert featuring poems from the project.

==== Parodies ====
Advertising campaigns for Polo mints and Greenpeace have both imitated the distinctive format of the project. The 1996 anthology Poems NOT on the Underground, by Roger Tagholm, is a collection of Underground-themed parodies of poems featured in the project.

== See also ==
- Art on the Underground - visual art across the London Underground network (previously Platform for Art)
- Poetry in Motion - a programme of poems on public transport in various cities in the USA
- Wall poems in Leiden - public poems in many languages in Leiden, Netherlands
