= Humoresque (1946 film) =

1946 film by Jean Negulesco

- theatrical poster
- Directed by: Jean Negulesco
- Screenplay by: Clifford Odets; Zachary Gold
- Based on: Humoresque: A Laugh on Life with a Tear Behind It; 1919 story in Cosmopolitan by Fannie Hurst
- Produced by: Jerry Wald
- Starring: Joan Crawford; John Garfield; Oscar Levant
- Cinematography: Ernest Haller
- Edited by: Rudi Fehr
- Music by: Franz Waxman
- Production company: Warner Bros. Pictures
- Distributed by: Warner Bros. Pictures
- Release date: December 25, 1946
- Running time: 125 minutes
- Country: United States
- Language: English
- Budget: $2,164,000
- Box office: $3,399,000

Humoresque is a 1946 American melodrama film by Warner Bros. Pictures starring Joan Crawford and John Garfield in a tale about a violinist and his patroness. The screenplay by Clifford Odets and Zachary Gold was based upon the 1919 short story "Humoresque" by Fannie Hurst, which previously was made into a film in 1920. Humoresque was directed by Jean Negulesco and produced by Jerry Wald.

== Plot ==
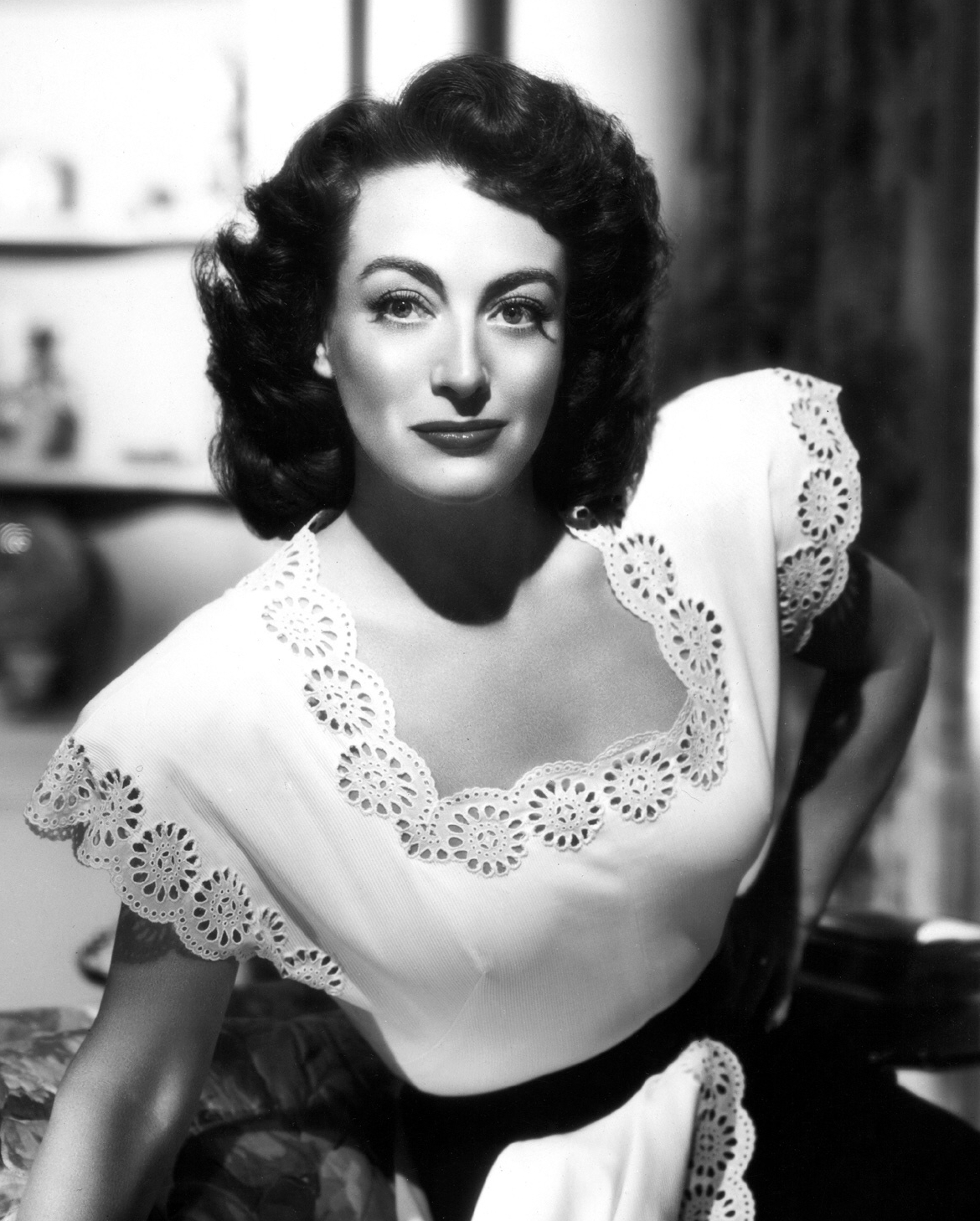
Joan Crawford in Humoresque

In New York City, a performance by noted violinist Paul Boray is cancelled. Something has happened that has brought Boray to rock bottom emotionally. At his apartment, he seems to be about to give up on his career; his manager Frederic Bauer is angry that Paul has misunderstood what performing would be like and admonishes him for thinking that music could no longer be part of his life. Paul's more sympathetic friend and accompanist Sid Jeffers asks Bauer to leave, and Boray says to Jeffers that he (Boray) always has wanted to do the right thing, but always has been "on the outside, looking in," and cannot "get back to that happy kid" he once was.

In the past, we see young Paul choosing a birthday present in a variety store. He rejects his father's suggestions and wants a violin; his father rejects this, partly because the violin is costly but mostly because he believes it's just a passing fancy on his son's part. Esther, his mother, supportive at this stage, buys the $8 violin for the boy.

A transition from his faltering first steps to being a gifted young violinist follows. In 1930, he overhears his family expressing frustration about their finances and how he is not bringing in any income. His father is dismissive of Paul's chances for success, and his brother, Phil, is extremely negative concerning his own possibilities for finding any job at all. Paul resolves to go out on his own so as not to be dependent on his family or take advantage of them. He finds a job with a locally broadcast orchestra in which Jeffers is the pianist.

At a party, Paul meets the hostess, Helen Wright, a patroness in a loveless marriage to an ineffectual, aging third husband, Victor. Helen is a self-centered, adulterous woman who uses men as sexual playthings and is initially baffled by the strong-willed and independent Boray. She is rude to him during the party, but the next day, she sends him a gold cigarette case and a note of apology. "Papa" Boray is impressed, but Esther is suspicious.

At first, Helen seems interested only in Boray's talent rather than in him as a person, though he is quick to press her on this issue. He gains a manager, Bauer, from her connections, and is now in love with her. On the beach, near the Wrights' Long Island home, he reaches out to Helen after a swim, but she runs away; later in the evening, she falls off a horse; as he tries to aid her, she resists, not wanting to be touched. He kisses her, and she tells him to leave her alone, although she clearly is drawn to him and makes no effort to run away.

Shortly, everything is different. As they lie at the ocean, Helen warns him he might be sorry that love was invented, but admits she cannot fight him any longer, and that she is in love with him. Waiting at home, Esther confronts him, pointing out that he has missed a date with Gina, also a musician and his long-time sweetheart. Esther does not believe Paul's denials that he has any interest in Helen. She warns him to be careful and to think about his future. After Paul's debut concert, Esther hears Victor's sneering opinion of Paul as a "savage".

After a several month tour across America, Paul has lunch with Gina. Sid arrives with Helen, who is immediately jealous and flees. Paul follows her, and they end up at Teddy's Bar. Helen makes a scene by smashing her drink against a wall, then she and Paul go to her home; she expresses anger at being neglected and begs him to let him into life. Paul points out that she's married; Helen shrugs this off, "they are both old enough to do as they choose." He kisses her.

At his new apartment with numerous photographs of Helen, he confesses his love for her to his mother. They argue, and his mother slaps him. Disquieted by rumors he has heard, Victor asks Helen for a divorce. Suspicious of her real intentions, he asks her if she really can change and be happy with Paul; Helen insists this is the first time she has known real love.

At a rehearsal, Paul is given a note from Helen claiming good news and asking to see him immediately. He crumples the note and continues with the rehearsal of the Carmen Fantasie (adapted for the film by Franz Waxman from Bizet's Carmen). At Teddy's Bar, Helen becomes increasingly drunk, and she is unable to tolerate the house pianist's performance of "Embraceable You". Paul arrives to take her home. He repeatedly tells her he wants to marry her but she tries to dissuade him, even as she declares how much she loves him.

She goes to visit Paul's mother to persuade her that in spite of the "type of woman she is," she really loves him. Esther does not believe Helen's professed good intentions and demands she leave Paul alone.

Neither Helen nor Esther attend Boray's next concert where he plays his transcription of Wagner's Liebestod. Helen listens to him on the radio. She drinks, becomes upset with herself, realizing that her dissolute ways can only taint Paul's future. She walks along the beach and into the ocean to her death. Later, on the beach, a distraught Paul is comforted by the loyal Jeffers.

Returning to the film's opening scene, Paul asks Jeffers to tell Bauer not to worry; he is not running away. The closing scene shows Paul walking on the street toward his family's grocery store.

== Cast ==
- Joan Crawford as Mrs. Helen Wright
- John Garfield as Paul Boray
- Oscar Levant as Sid Jeffers
- J. Carrol Naish as Papa Rudy Boray
- Joan Chandler as Gina
- Tom D'Andrea as Phil Boray
- Peggy Knudsen as Florence Boray
- Ruth Nelson as Mama Esther Boray
- Craig Stevens as Monte Loeffler
- Paul Cavanagh as Mr. Victor Wright
- Richard Gaines as Bauer - Paul's 1st producer
- John Abbott as Rozner - conducts Nat.Inst.Orch.
- Robert Blake as Paul Boray - child (as Bobby Blake)
- Tommy Cook as Phil Boray - child
- Don McGuire as Teddy #2 - Prop. of Teddy's Bar

== Production ==
The movie is the second adaptation of the novel, the first being a 1920 silent version directed by Frank Borzage. It was Crawford's first film after her Oscar-winning role in Mildred Pierce, and her third for Warner Bros., after being bought out by MGM (who paid Crawford $100,000 when the contract was terminated by mutual consent). Costumes for Humoresque were designed by Adrian and Bernard Newman.

During an August 15, 1973 appearance on The Tonight Show, Robert Blake stated he had been unable to generate tears during one of his scenes. John Garfield cleared the set and began to tell him about his own childhood, his mother's death and growing up on the streets in the Bronx. It had the desired effect on the young Blake, and he was able to complete the scene.

== Music ==
Franz Waxman orchestrated and conducted the score. Violinist Isaac Stern served as musical advisor, and the film includes close-ups of Stern's hands playing the violin, as the hands of Garfield. Stern was the actual violinist on the movie's soundtrack. Oscar Levant, who played Sid Jeffers, a celebrated pianist, plays on the soundtrack. Eric DeLamarter, former associate conductor and organist of the Chicago Symphony Orchestra, appears in the film as the conductor. The score and parts of the Carmen Fantasie played in the film are published by Fidelio Music and is available on IMSLP.

Parts of these classical music pieces are heard in the film:

- Antonín Dvořák: Humoresque Op. 101 No. 7, in G♭ major
- Rimsky-Korsakov: Flight of the Bumblebee
- Richard Wagner: Tristan und Isolde and especially its final Liebestod
- Édouard Lalo: Symphonie espagnole
- Tchaikovsky: Romeo and Juliet
- Tchaikovsky: Piano Concerto No. 1
- Tchaikovsky: Violin Concerto
- Brahms: Violin Concerto
- Brahms: Waltz in A♭ major, Op. 39 No. 15
- Bizet: Carmen suite
- Sarasate: Zigeunerweisen (Gypsy Airs)
- Mendelssohn: Violin Concerto
- Wieniawski: Violin Concerto No. 2
- César Franck: Violin Sonata
- Edvard Grieg: Piano Concerto
- Sergei Prokofiev: Piano Concerto No. 3
- Dmitri Shostakovich: Polka
- Bach: Sonata in G minor
- Chopin: Ballade No. 4 in F minor, Op. 52
- Chopin: Étude in G♭ major, Op. 10, No. 5
- Chopin: Waltz in C♯ minor, Op. 64, No. 2

Songs in the film:

- Arthur Schwartz (music) and Howard Dietz (lyrics): "I Guess I'll Have To Change My Plans"
- Richard Rodgers (music) and Lorenz Hart (lyrics): "My Heart Stood Still"
- George Gershwin (music) and Ira Gershwin (lyrics): "Embraceable You"
- Richard Rodgers (music) and Lorenz Hart (lyrics): "You Took Advantage Of Me"
- Cole Porter: "You Do Something to Me"
- Cole Porter: "What Is This Thing Called Love?"

Columbia Masterworks released an album of music from this movie consisting of four 78-rpm phonograph records (Columbia Masterworks set MM-657, copyright 1946).

In 1998, Nonesuch Records released an album of music from this movie, recorded in 1997 in London and New York, featuring violinist Nadja Salerno-Sonnenberg.

== Critical reception ==
Lawrence J. Quirk commented "Humoresque is undoubtedly Crawford's finest performance ... Her timing was flawless, her appearance lovely, her emotions depthful."

Bosley Crowther in The New York Times of December 26, 1946 observed "[T]here is certainly nothing humorous about the lachrymose Humoresque ... It is rather a mawkish lamentation upon the hopelessness of love between an art-dedicated violinist and a high-toned lady who lives for self alone... [T]he Warner Brothers have wrapped this piteous affair in a blanket of soul-tearing music which is supposed to make it spiritually purgative... The music, we must say, is splendid—and, if you will only shut your eyes so that you don't have to watch Mr. Garfield leaning his soulful face against that violin or Miss Crawford violently emoting... you may enjoy it very much." Robert Osborne of Turner Classic Movies explains, "Garfield did not actually play the violin in the closeup scenes...the hands were actually the hands of an unknown professional violinist. Very convincing."

== Awards and honors ==
Franz Waxman received an Academy Award nomination for Best Music, Scoring of a Dramatic or Comedy Picture.

== Box office ==
The film's budget was estimated to be around $2,164,000. The film fared well at the box office and grossed $3,399,000, and the film was hailed a success. With inflation in 2007, the gross is $35,737,750.

According to Warner Bros., the film earned $2,281,000 domestically and $1,118,000 in foreign markets. According to Variety, it earned $2.6 million in rentals in 1947.

== In popular culture ==
Humoresque was parodied on the television show SCTV in 1981. The Joan Crawford role was played by Catherine O'Hara as Crawford, and the John Garfield role was played by violin virtuoso Eugene Fodor.

In 1998, pop star Madonna released a video for her single "The Power of Good-Bye", based on several scenes from the movie.

== Home media ==
Warner Archive released Humoresque on Blu-ray on November 26, 2024.
