= Boomerang Bill =

1922 film

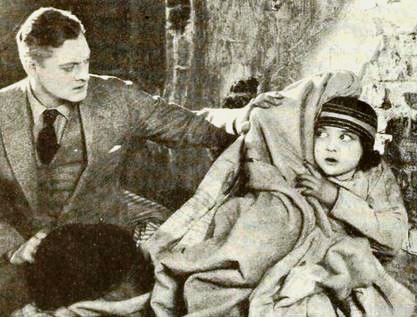
- Lionel Barrymore and Miriam Battista in Boomerang Bill
- Directed by: Tom Terriss
- Written by: Tom Terriss (scenario)
- Based on: "Boomerang Bill" by Jack Boyle
- Produced by: William Randolph Hearst (for Cosmopolitan Productions)
- Starring: Lionel Barrymore; Marguerite Marsh
- Cinematography: Al Liguori
- Distributed by: Paramount Pictures
- Release date: February 12, 1922
- Running time: 6 reels; 5,489 feet
- Country: United States
- Language: Silent (English intertitles)

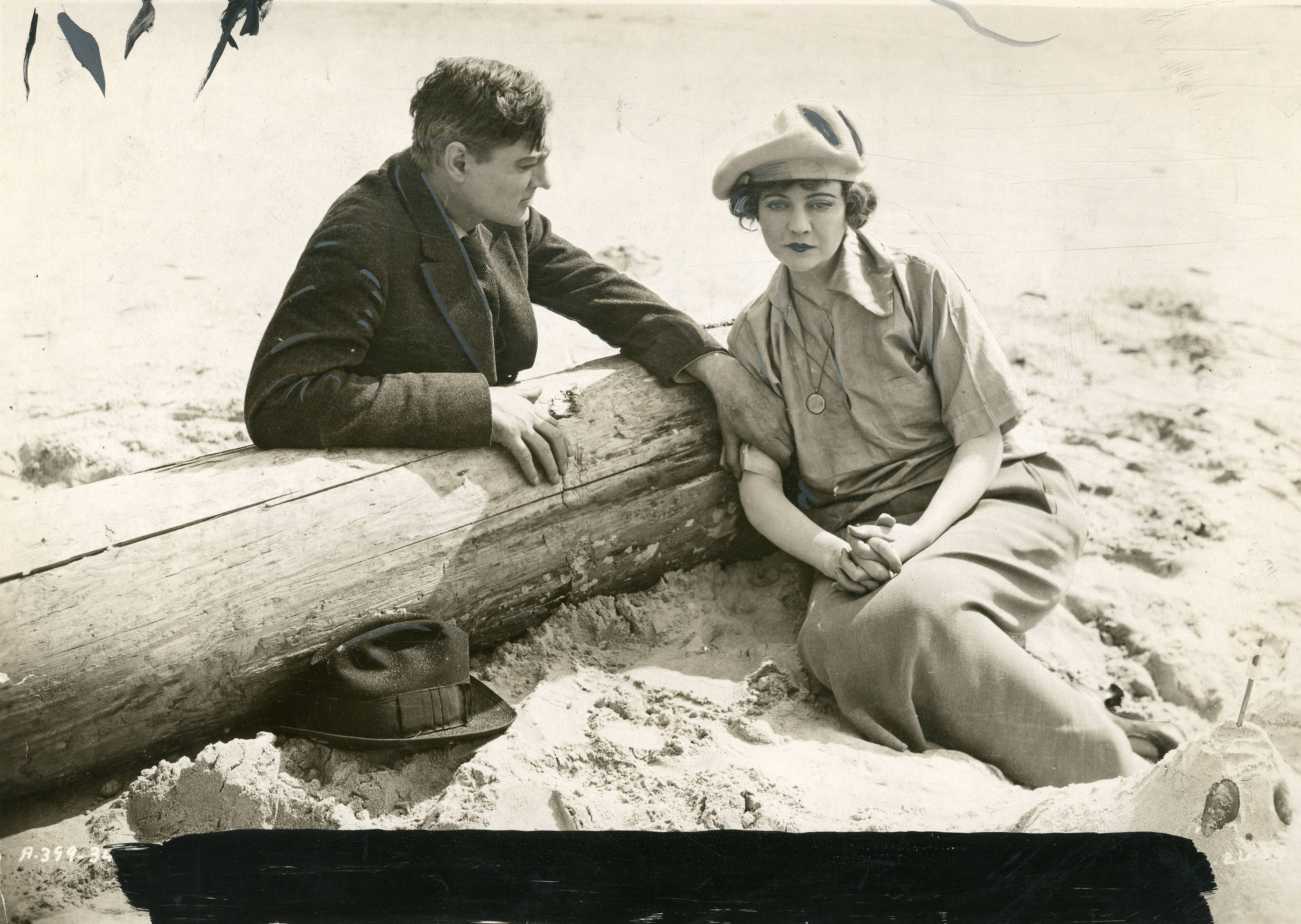
Lionel Barrymore and Marguerite Marsh..

Boomerang Bill is an extant 1922 American silent crime melodrama film produced by Cosmopolitan Productions and distributed through Paramount Pictures. Adapted from a Boston Blackie short story by Jack Boyle, it was directed by Tom Terriss and stars veteran actor Lionel Barrymore. It is preserved incomplete at the Library of Congress and George Eastman Museum.

== Cast ==
- Lionel Barrymore as Boomerang Bill
- Marguerite Marsh as Annie
- Margaret Seddon as Annie's Mother
- Frank Shannon as Terrence O'Malley
- Matthew Betz as Tony the Wop
- Charles Fang as Chinaman
- Harry Lee as Chinaman
- Miriam Battista as Chinese Girl
- Helen Kim as Chinese Girl
