= Murray Korman =

American publicity photographer

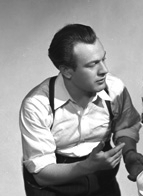
- Born: Moritz Korman; March 16, 1902; Kamenets Podolsk, Podolia, Russian Empire
- Died: August 9, 1961 (aged 59); New York, New York
- Occupations: Photographer, illustrator

Murray Korman (March 16, 1902 – August 10, 1961) was an American publicity photographer. He made his reputation in New York City as a "Hollywood style high key high gloss glamour" photographer whose clients ranged from showgirls to famous entertainers to members of "cafe society". Unlike other major theatrical portraitists of the time, he created his images in the camera, rather than manipulating them later at the printing stage. During the height of his fame, he was considered "the expert on beauty in his time".

== Personal background ==
Moritz Korman was born on March 16, 1902, in Russian Empire (now Kamianets-Podilskyi, Ukraine). After emigrating to the United States, he changed his name to Murray Korman. In 1907, when his mother died, his father emigrated to New York City, settling on the Lower East Side of Manhattan. Korman and four older siblings joined him a few years later. He attended P.S. 13 and later transferred to P.S. 160 (now home to Clemente Soto Vélez Cultural and Educational Center). Already spending most of his class time sketching and doing caricatures, Korman left school at the age of fourteen before receiving a diploma and took a job in a Kewpie doll factory painting faces, at which he became so successful that he wound up doing all the face painting on a contract basis in a shop of his own.

In 1917, Korman enrolled in night classes at the Cooper Union School of Art, continuing through 1924 while also maintaining his Kewpie-painting business. He closed his Kewpie business in 1924 and began a two-year stint doing sketches for newspapers and Broadway shows. He took up photography in 1926 after realizing that he could create images more rapidly and effectively with the camera than with the pen.

== Professional background ==
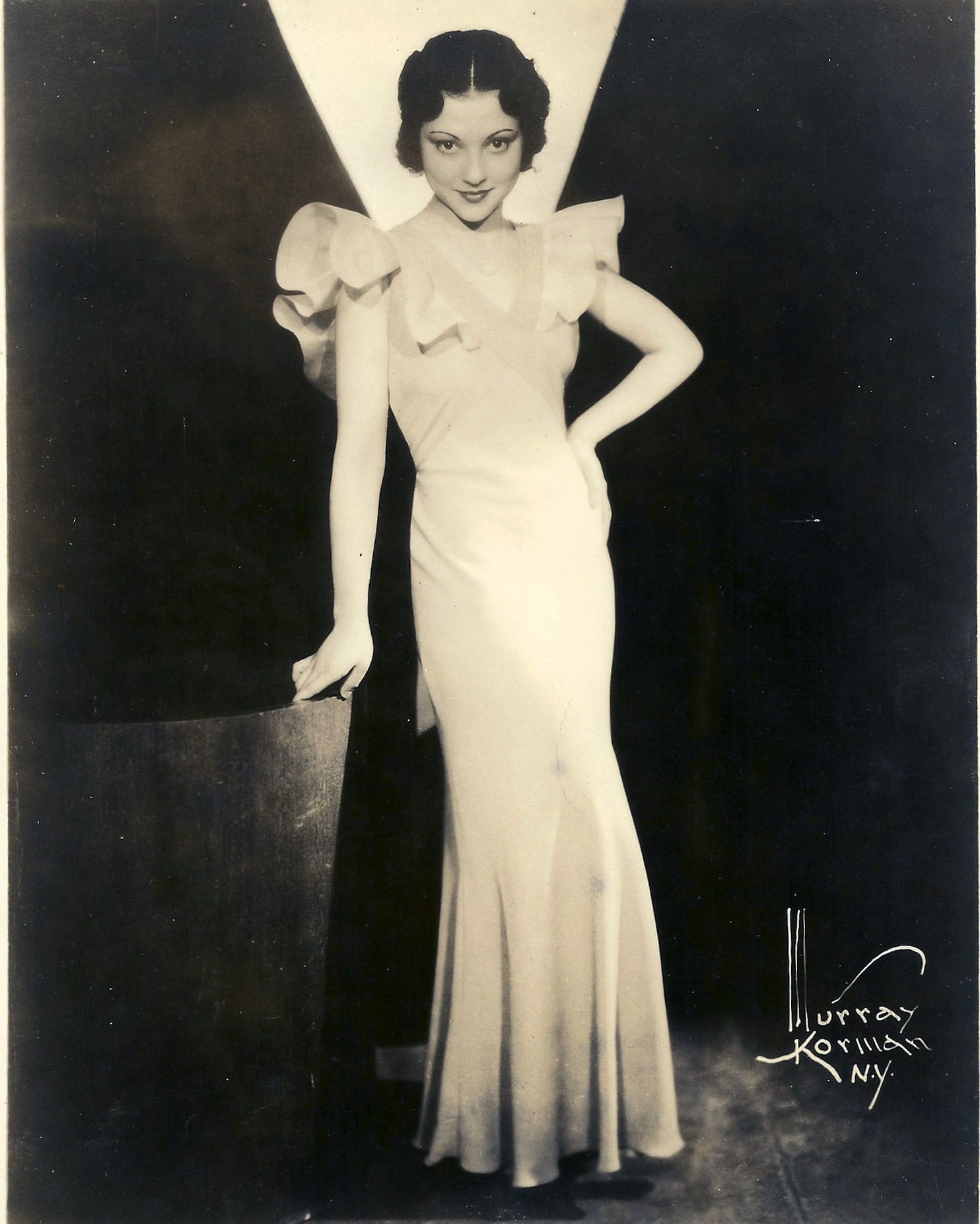
Korman's publicity photo of actress Miriam Battista, age 20

He was successful almost immediately. The New Yorker magazine, in a 1942 profile of Korman titled "The One Big Name," paraphrased newspaper feature writer John Ferris describing the photographer's impact on Broadway as "What Holbein was to the court of Henry VIII, Murray Korman is to Broadway."

Korman was active as a photographer from 1926 through the 1950s, shuttling between his professional studio on Madison Avenue, where he photographed debutantes and socialites (including Clare Boothe Luce), and his more casual loft studio on Seventh Avenue near 47th Street, where he took publicity photographs of aspiring entertainers and other lesser-known individuals. In her book, Moon Over Vaudeville, Maureen McCabe describes the impact on the viewer of Korman's publicity images of young Broadway hopefuls: "What I love about Korman's early photographs is how he captured the luminescent moment in time...before they encountered any disappointments." Korman's images were sometimes controversial; in photographing showgirls, he specialized in "leg art and nudes because people looked at them and because he found women vain enough to desire that kind of picture." He took nearly 450,000 pictures throughout his career.

In 1934, the Hollywood Cabaret Restaurant mounted a lobby exhibit of Korman's drawings and photographs of Hollywood showgirls and subsequently published a small souvenir book responding to "many requests from authors, publishers and private individuals for some of these artistic studies." In an essay in the book entitled "A Toast to an Artist," screenwriter Paul Yawitz called Korman "one of America's outstanding modern artists", and noted that "his originality and versatility are quickly perceived in the many ways by which he interprets the beauty he finds in his subjects. Through his black and white, crayon, pastel, and camera studies, he displays a skill that places his work foremost in its field."

In 1936, Korman was profiled in a syndicated newspaper story published by the Associated Press. He said he preferred to photograph blondes because "brunettes need strong lights, and blondes emerge better" with "better molding of the face, no shadows." He said he had coined a new word: "vitabeaut", to describe a woman like Ginger Rogers who was "vibrant, beautiful, athletic, with a beaming personality, bright eyes, [and] brilliant hair."

For an exhibit at the 1939 New York World's Fair, Korman shot some of his most memorable photos, a series called Dream of Venus, featuring poses created by surrealist Salvador Dalí acting as art director. Korman also took publicity photos of swimmers for Billy Rose's Aquacade which was a hit at the fair.

In 1947, Korman wrote a five-part teaching pamphlet titled "The Art of Glamour Photography", describing his methods. Columnist Dorothy Kilgallen reported in 1948 that a stripper named Winnie Garrett was threatening to sue Korman for allegedly selling glamour portraits he had taken of her. Korman photographed and married actress Pat Farrell. They divorced in 1952.

Korman died penniless on August 9, 1961.

== Portrait subjects ==
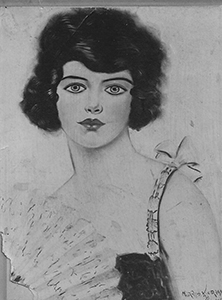
Drawing by Murray Korman, ca. 1925

- Fred Astaire, dancer, actor, singer
- Josephine Baker, exotic dancer and singer
- Miriam Battista, actress
- Fanny Brice, singer, actress
- Claudette Colbert, actress
- Ann Corio, dancer, actress
- Gala Dalí, artist's model, wife of Salvador Dalí
- Salvador Dalí, artist
- Julian Eltinge, female impersonator
- Gertie Gitana, British music hall performer
- Betty Grable, dancer, actress
- Nils Granlund, Broadway producer
- Eleanor Holm, Olympic swimmer, Aquacade star
- Bob Hope, comedian, actor
- Lena Horne, singer
- Edward James, poet, patron of surrealist art
- Stan Kenton, trombonist, bandleader
- Julien Levy, art dealer
- Clare Boothe Luce, author, legislator, ambassador
- Alicia Markova, ballerina and choreographer
- Edna Mayo, silent film actress
- Ray Middleton, character actor
- Carmen Miranda, singer, dancer, actress
- Ona Munson, actress
- Mae Emma Zenke Orvis, commodities broker, opera singer, philanthropist
- Channing Pollock, magician and actor
- Peggy Ryan, dancer
- Ann Sheridan, actress
- Kay Thompson, composer, musician, actress, singer, author of Eloise series
- Ethel Waters, singer
- Marie Wilson, American actress

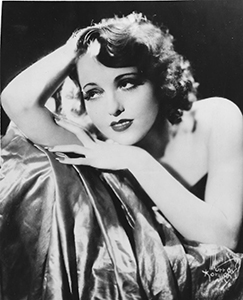
Publicity photo by Murray Korman, ca. 1930

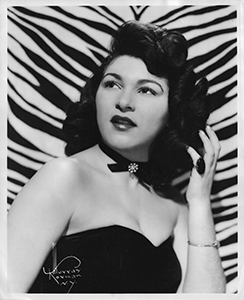
Publicity photo by Murray Korman, ca. 1940

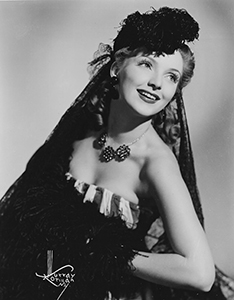
Publicity photo by Murray Korman, date unknown

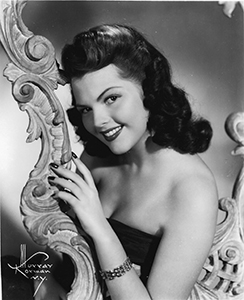
Publicity photo by Murray Korman, ca. 1945
