= No More Ladies (play) =

1934 play

- Written by: A. E. Thomas
- Original language: English
- Genre: Comedy
- Setting: Townsends' New York City apartment, Warrens' living room in Southampton, New York

Premiere
- Date premiered: January 23, 1934
- Place premiered: Booth Theatre; New York City, New York

No More Ladies was a 1934 Broadway three-act comedy written by A. E. Thomas, produced by Lee Shubert, and staged by Harry Wagstaff Gribble with scenic design created by Watson Barratt. It ran for 162 performances from January 23, 1934 to June 1934 at the Booth Theatre. The play was included in Burns Mantle's The Best Plays of 1933-1934. It was adapted into the 1935 film No More Ladies directed by Edward H. Griffith and starring Joan Crawford, Robert Montgomery and Franchot Tone.

== Cast ==
- Edward Fielding as Mr. Anderson Townsend
- Mary Sargent as Mrs. Anderson Townsend
- Lucile Watson as Mrs. Fanny Townsend
- Ruth Weston as Marcia Townsend
- Melvyn Douglas as Sheridan Warren
- Miriam Battista as Jacquette
- Rex O'Malley as James Salston
- John Bramall as Dickens
- Bradley Cass as Oliver Allen
- Boyd Davis as Stafford
- Louis Hector as Earl of Moulton
- Nancy Ryan as Diana
- Marcella Swanson as Teresa German
