= No More Ladies =

1935 film by George Cukor, Edward H. Griffith

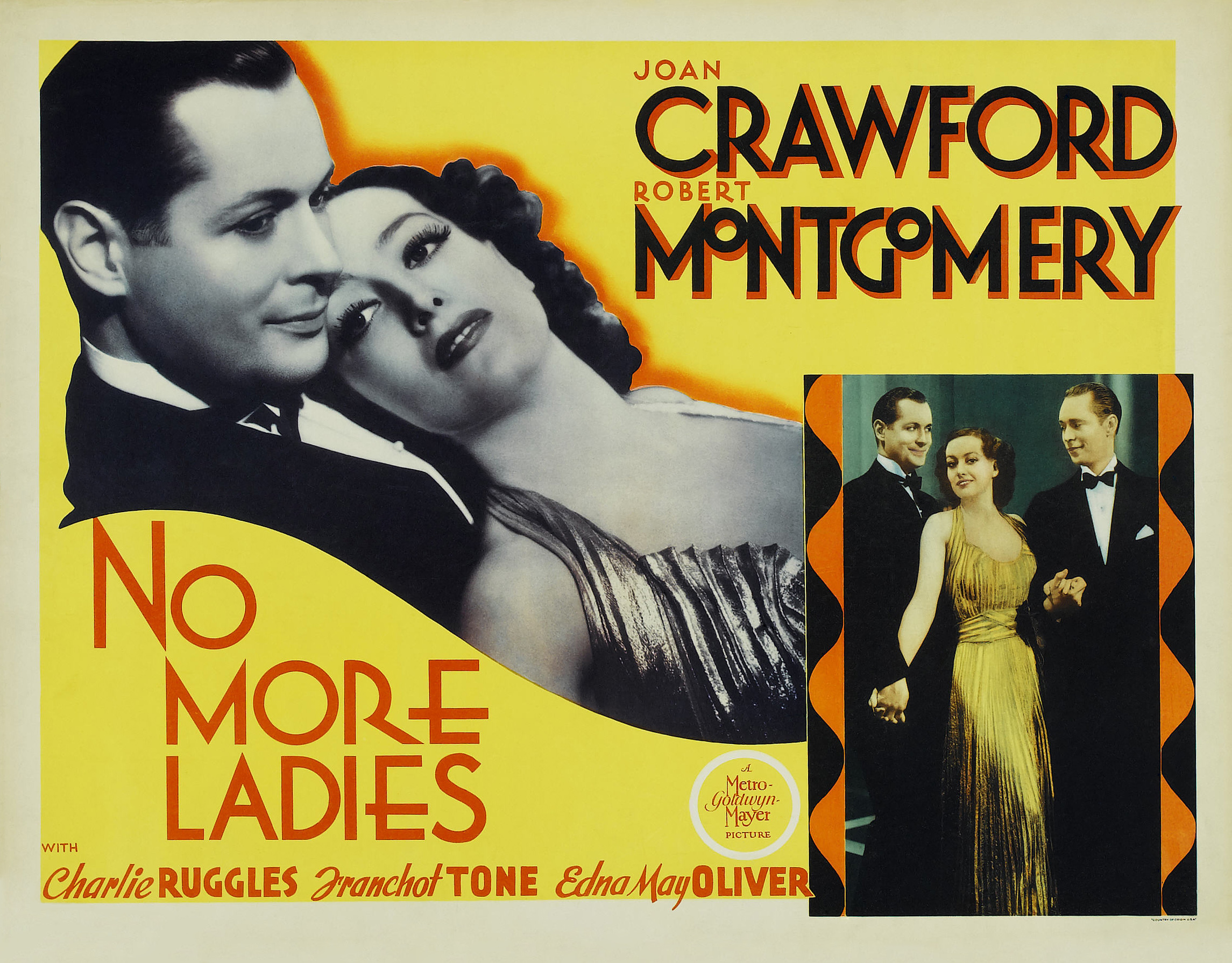
- Lobby card
- Directed by: Edward H. Griffith; E. J. Babille (assistant)
- Screenplay by: Donald Ogden Stewart; Horace Jackson
- Based on: No More Ladies; 1934 play by A.E.Thomas
- Produced by: Irving Thalberg
- Starring: Joan Crawford; Robert Montgomery; Charlie Ruggles; Franchot Tone; Vivienne Osborne
- Cinematography: Oliver T. Marsh
- Edited by: Frank E. Hull
- Music by: Edward Ward
- Production company: Metro-Goldwyn-Mayer
- Distributed by: Metro-Goldwyn-Mayer
- Release date: June 1935
- Running time: 80 minutes
- Country: United States
- Language: English
- Budget: $765,000
- Box office: $1,623,000

No More Ladies is a 1935 American romantic comedy film directed by Edward H. Griffith. The film stars Joan Crawford and Robert Montgomery, and co-stars Charlie Ruggles, Franchot Tone, and Edna May Oliver. The screenplay credited to Donald Ogden Stewart and Horace Jackson is based on a stage comedy of the same name by A.E. Thomas.

== Plot ==
Marcia is a young socialite who shares her New York home with her grandmother, Fanny Townsend. Marcia is a firm believer that a couple must be faithful to one another, unlike her peers who do not feel so strongly. Marcia meets Jim, who agrees with her on the subject of a couple's monogamy and pursues her. Marcia, however, decides to pursue Sherry, whom Marcia sees as a challenge and seeks to cure him of his philandering and womanizing nature.

After a night at a club where some of Sherry's past flings swirl about him, the couple discuss the institution of marriage and have clearly divergent views. Despite this, Marcia and Sherry are married, yet Sherry continues to be flirtatious. Even on their honeymoon, Sherry talks with the gorgeous Sally French. Later, when the newly married couple returns home, Sherry goes home with a friend's date, Theresa German, and doesn't return that night. Marcia realizes her philandering husband has already ruined their marriage. Sherry admits to spending the night with Theresa and admits his infidelity in a rather abrupt and unapologetic manner.

Marcia decides to teach her husband a lesson by having a party to which she invites Sherry's former flames along with their mates. Marcia announces that she intends to be unfaithful to her husband, by having a fling with Jim, who still cares for Marcia. Marcia and Jim escape from the party during a game of charades, and she returns the next morning. Sherry then sees how much his wife loves him and is convinced to reform his former ways. In any event, Marcia remained faithful to her beliefs and her husband and did not go through as she planned.

== Cast ==
- Joan Crawford as Marcia
- Robert Montgomery as Sherry Warren
- Charlie Ruggles as Edgar Holden
- Franchot Tone as Jim Salston
- Edna May Oliver as Fanny Townsend
- Gail Patrick as Theresa German
- Reginald Denny as Oliver
- Vivienne Osborne as Lady Diana Knowleton
- Joan Fontaine as Caroline (as Joan Burfield)
- Arthur Treacher as Lord Knowleton
- David S. Horsley as James McIntyre Duffy
- Jean Chatburn as Sally French

== Production ==
Rachel Crothers created the original screen adaptation, but had her name removed from the screen credits, publicly dissatisfied with the studio's changes to her screenplay; other uncredited writers were Edith Fitzgerald and George Oppenheimer. Griffith's illness prevented him from finishing the film, so George Cukor took over as director (but declined a screen credit).

Crawford made the film in her tenth year as an MGM contract player; the film was Joan Fontaine's big-screen debut.

== Reception ==
According to Andre Sennwald of The New York Times, "the photoplay, despite its stage ancestry, is out of the same glamour factory as Miss Crawford's Forsaking All Others. If it is less furiously arch than that modern classic of sledgehammer whimsey, it is also somewhat less successful as entertainment. Out of the labors of the brigade of writers who tinkered with the screen play, there remain a sprinkling of nifties which make for moments of hilarity in an expanse of tedium and fake sophistication." Time magazine called it a "pleasant, witty time-waster" depicting a "variety of white chromium modernistic interiors, a welter of cynical badinage over cocktails and cigarets, [and] the complications of rich idle adultery." Writing for The Spectator, Graham Greene described the film as "slickly 'problem'", "second rate", and "transient", although he praised the acting of Ruggles (playing Edgar Holden).

=== Box office ===
According to MGM records the film earned $1,117,000 in the US and Canada and $506,000 elsewhere resulting in a profit of $166,000.
