= Margaret Severn =

American dancer

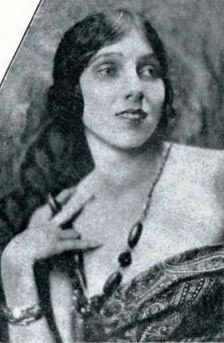
Severn in The Greenwich Village Follies of 1920.

Margeret Severn (14 August 1901 – 7 July 1997) was an internationally acclaimed dancer who was most famous for using more than a dozen different Benda masks in the Greenwich Village Follies of 1921. She also played a dancer in the film The Good Provider (1922).

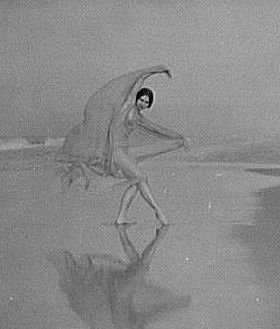
Scarf dance (Margaret Severn)

A film about her work, Dance Masks, was made by Peter Lipskis, distributed by The University of California, Berkeley Extension Media Center, and reviewed by Choice.
