= Humoresque =

Genre of Romantic music

Dvořák's Humoresque, Op. 101, No. 7
Arranged for viola and piano by Elias Goldstein, performed by Elias Goldstein (viola) and Monica Pavel (piano)

Humoresque, Op. 10, No. 2
From Tchaikovsky's Morceaux (1871), performed by the United States Navy Band Symphony Orchestra in 1955

Humoresque (German: Humoreske) is a genre of Romantic music characterized by pieces with fanciful humor in the sense of mood rather than wit.

== Notable examples ==
Notable examples of the humoresque style are:

- Robert Schumann: Humoreske in B-flat major, Op. 20, 1839
- Antonín Dvořák: set of eight Humoresques, Op. 101, 1894, of which No. 7 in G-flat major is well known.
- Sergei Rachmaninoff: Humoresque in G major, No. 5 from his Morceaux de salon, Op. 10, 1894
- Jean Sibelius: Six Humoresques, Opp. 87 & 89, 1917 to 1918
- Noel Rawsthorne: Hornpipe Humoresque for organ, based on The Sailor's Hornpipe and including parts of "Rule, Britannia!" and the Toccata from Widor's Symphony for Organ No. 5

== See also ==
- Capriccio
- Humoresque (literature)
