= The Seal of Silence =

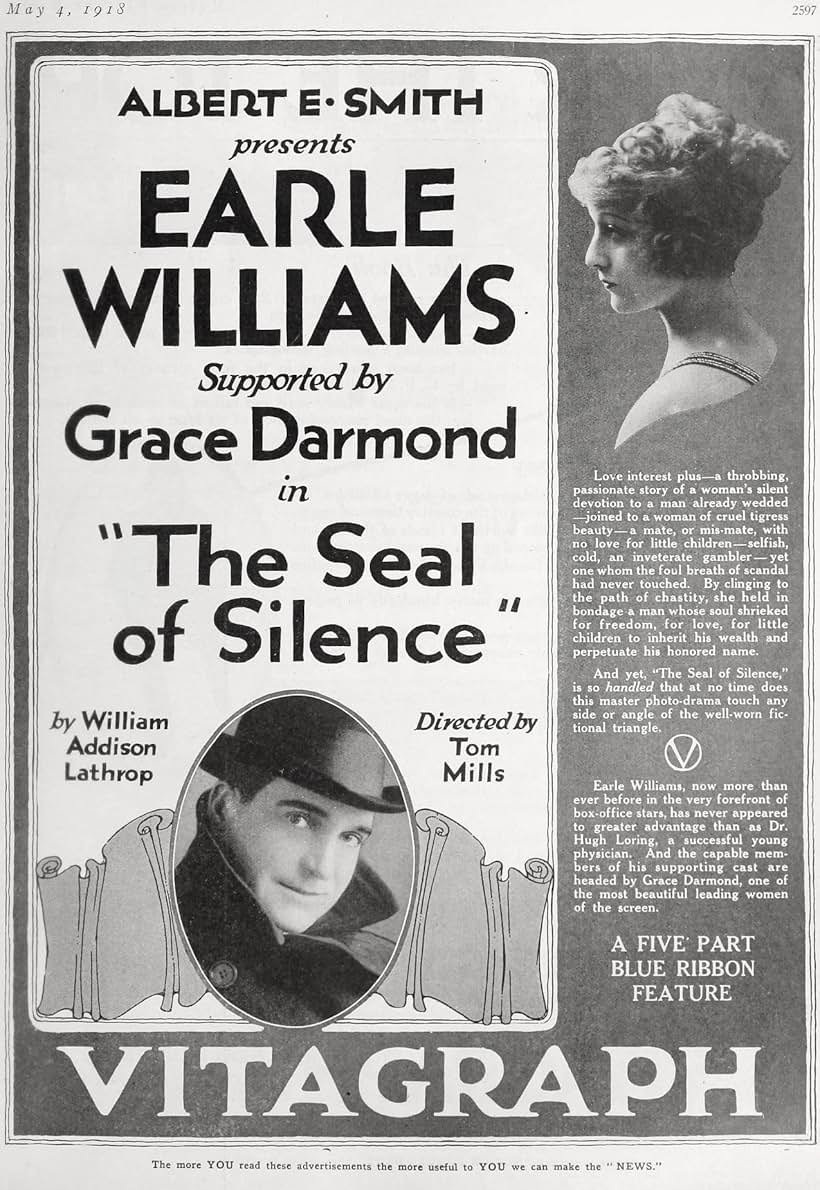
- Directed by: Thomas R. Mills
- Written by: William Addison Lathrop
- Produced by: Vitagraph Company of America; Albert E. Smith
- Starring: Earle Williams; Bobby Connelly
- Distributed by: Greater Vitagraph (V-L-S-E)
- Release date: April 29, 1918
- Running time: 5 reels
- Country: USA

The Seal of Silence is a lost 1918 silent feature film. It was directed by Thomas R. Mills and starred Earle Williams. It was produced and distributed by the Vitagraph Company of America.

Not to be confused with a 1913 film of the same name by Mutual.

== Cast ==
- Earle Williams - Dr. Hugh Loring
- Grace Darmond - Ruth Garden
- Kathleen Kirkham - Mrs. Loring
- Martin Best - Mr. Pelham
- Kate Price - Mrs. McBride
- Colin Kenny - Beverly Rivers
- Pat Moore - Boy
- Bobby Connelly - ?undetermined

== External list ==
- The Seal of Silence at IMDb
- allmovie.com
- picture card..if picture doesn't load click worthpoint link then click back
