= Gerard Benson =

- Born: Gerard John Benson; 9 April 1931; London, England
- Died: 28 April 2014 (aged 83); Oxenhope, Bradford, England
- Occupations: Poet, teacher and author

Gerard John Benson (9 April 1931 – 28 April 2014) was an English Quaker poet, teacher, and author. His mother separated from his father Arthur Benson, and he was raised by a family of Christian fundamentalists for the first ten years of his life, thinking they were his parents. Then his mother Eileen married the Romanian-born émigré composer Francis Chagrin and he went to live with them.

Benson had worked as an intelligence decoder in Britain and as an actor, but his vocation was poetry. Originally from London, Benson settled in Bradford in 1989 with his writer/artist wife, Cathy Russell; the couple lived in Manningham. He was a member of the Barrow Poets. He was named poet laureate of the City of Bradford (2008) and was a founding editor, with Judith Chernaik and Cicely Herbert, of Poems on the Underground.

Benson died on 28 April 2014, aged 83. Shortly before his death, the 83-year-old had recently returned from the BBC in London where he had made recordings of his poetry for the Poetry Archive.

== Publications ==
- London Poems On The Underground (1996); ISBN 978-0304349029
- To Catch an Elephant (2002); ISBN 978-1902382401
- Omba Bolomba (2005); ISBN 978-1902382708
- Best Poems on the Underground (2009); ISBN 978-0297859079
- A Good Time (2013); ISBN 978-1906613198
