= Judith Chernaik =

Musicologist and founder of Poems on the Underground

Judith Chernaik (/ˈtʃɜːrnæk/ CHERN-ak; born 24 October 1934) is an American-born, British-resident academic, novelist and editor. She was the creator and one of the founding editors of the Poems on the Underground literary project.

== Life ==
Born and raised in Brooklyn, Judith Chernaik studied at Cornell University and earned her PhD from Yale. She subsequently taught at Columbia University, Tufts University, and Queen Mary University of London. She married the literary scholar Warren L. Chernaik in 1956, and moved to the UK with him in 1972 when he was due to take up a position at Queen Mary. The couple had three children, Laura, David and Sara. In 2026 she was living in Gospel Oak, in northwest London.

Chernaik is Jewish. She was offered, but declined, an OBE.

As a literary critic, she has published a book-length study on Percy Bysshe Shelley, and articles on Shelley, Byron, Keats and Henry James; as a musicologist, she published a biography of Robert Schumann in 2018, Schumann: The Faces and the Masks, and has written academic articles on the works of Schumann, Clara Schumann, Felix Mendelssohn, and Frédéric Chopin.

== Poems on the Underground ==
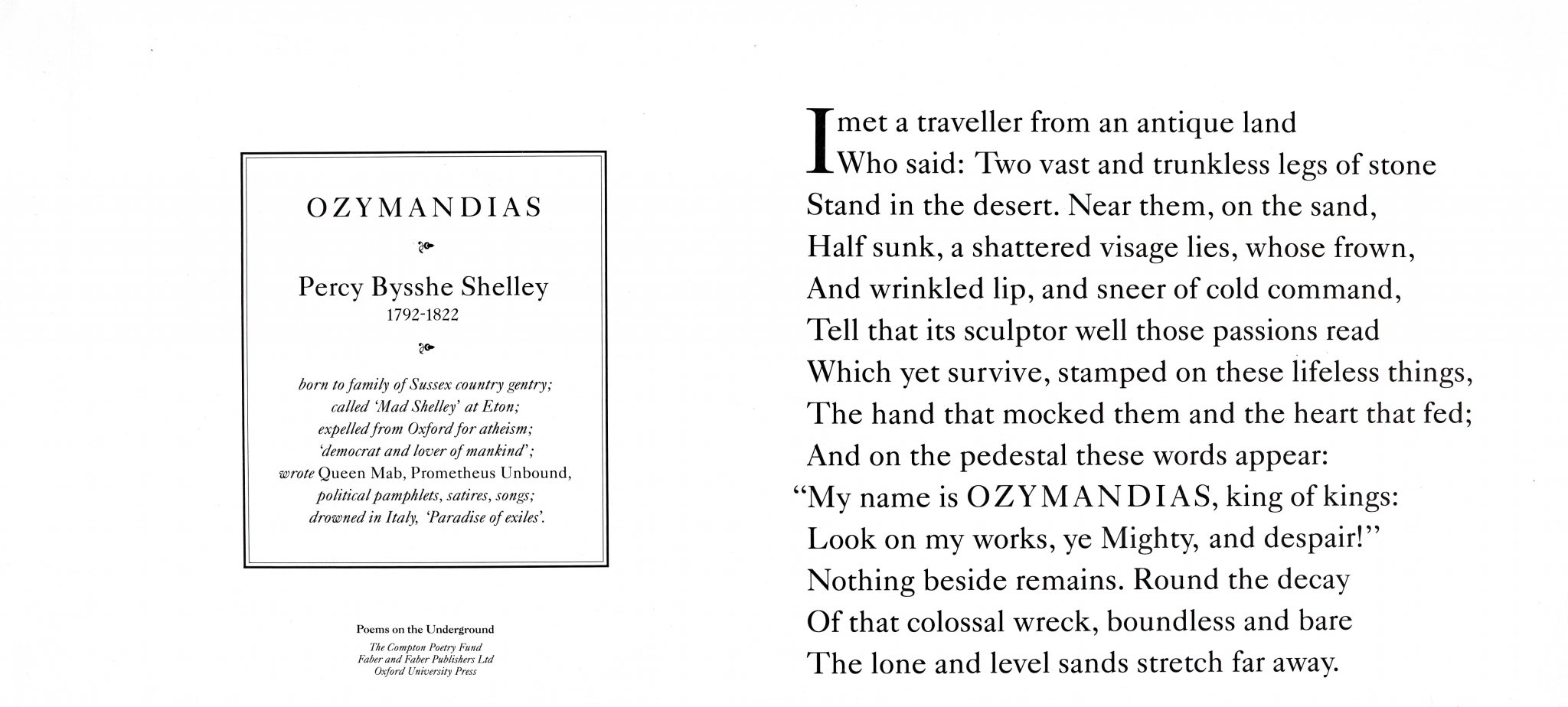
A poster for Shelley's "Ozymandias", used in the first-ever batch of Poems on the Underground.

After moving to the UK in 1972, Chernaik fell "absolutely in love" with London, and found she much preferred the London Underground to the New York subway system. She became friends with Gerard Benson and Cicely Herbert, whose work with the Barrow Poets performance group gave her the idea of placing poems in vacant advertisement spaces on Underground trains. Chernaik proposed the idea to Transport for London and won an Arts Council grant to cover the costs; the project launched in 1986 with Chernaik, Benson and Herbert as editors. It was popular immediately; after the public response to the first sets of poems, Transport for London agreed to donate the advertising space to the project for free and to provide four times as many slots.

After the project had been running for several years, Chernaik approached several publishers with a proposal for an anthology of poems featured on train posters. She received several rejections before Cassell accepted it; the book had sold more than 250,000 copies as of 2016.

Following Benson's 2014 death and Herbert's choice to step away from the project, Chernaik invited Imtiaz Dharker and George Szirtes to join her as replacement editors. Chernaik was still on the editorial panel as of the project's fortieth anniversary in 2026, though joked that she should retire, by then being 91. She has written and interviewed extensively about the project, including a BBC Radio 4 episode and an interview for the London Transport Museum's oral history archive.

== Selected publications ==
=== Books ===
==== Academic ====
- The Lyrics of Shelley, Case Western Reserve University Press, 1972; ISBN 978-0-8295-0212-1
- Schumann: The Faces and the Masks, New York: Alfred A. Knopf, 2018; ISBN 978-0-451-49446-7

==== Novels and plays ====
- Double Fault, G.P. Putnam & Sons, 1975
- The Daughter: A Novel Based on the Life of Eleanor Marx, New York: Harper & Row, 1979; ISBN 978-0-06-010757-4
- Leah, New York: Macmillan, 1987; ISBN 978-0-333-44582-2
- Mab’s Daughters, New York: Macmillan, 1991; ISBN 978-0-333-51422-1
  - Translated into Italian by Eleonora Chiavetta as Le figlie di Mab, Ferrara, 1997; ISBN 978-88-86780-12-4
- Love’s Children: A Novel, New York: Alfred A. Knopf, 1992; ISBN 978-0-394-51325-6
