= The Rosary (1922 film) =

1922 film

- Directed by: Jerome Storm
- Story by: Bernard McConville
- Based on: The Rosary by Edward Everett Rose
- Produced by: William Nicholas Selig; Sam E. Rork
- Starring: Lewis Stone; Jane Novak; Wallace Beery; Robert Gordon; Eugenie Besserer; Dore Davidson
- Cinematography: Edward Linden
- Production company: Selig-Rork Productions
- Distributed by: Associated First National Pictures
- Release date: January 16, 1922
- Running time: 70 minutes
- Country: United States
- Language: English

The Rosary is a 1922 American silent drama film directed by Jerome Storm and written by Bernard McConville. It is based on the 1910 play The Rosary by Edward Everett Rose. The film stars Lewis Stone, Jane Novak, Wallace Beery, Robert Gordon, Eugenie Besserer and Dore Davidson. The film was released on January 16, 1922, by Associated First National Pictures.

== Cast ==
- Lewis Stone as Father Brian Kelly
- Jane Novak as Vera Mather
- Wallace Beery as Kenwood Wright
- Robert Gordon as Bruce Wilton
- Eugenie Besserer as Widow Kathleen Wilson
- Dore Davidson as Isaac Abrahamson
- Pomeroy Cannon as Donald MacTavish
- Bert Woodruff as Captain Caleb Mather
- Mildred June as Alice Wilton
- Harold Goodwin as Skeeters Martin

== Censorship ==
Before The Rosary could be exhibited in Kansas, the Kansas Board of Review required the elimination of the scene where a bomb is placed under a house.
