= At the Stage Door =

1921 film directed by Christy Cabanne

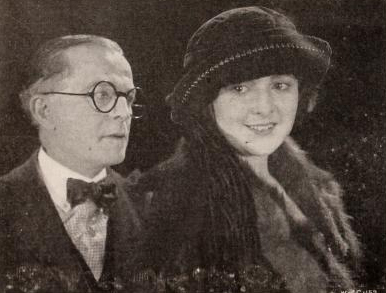
- Billy Quirk and Billie Dove in a scene from the film
- Directed by: Christy Cabanne
- Written by: Christy Cabanne
- Produced by: Christy Cabanne
- Starring: Billie Dove; Huntley Gordon; Miriam Battista
- Production company: Robertson-Cole Pictures Corporation
- Distributed by: Film Booking Offices of America
- Release date: December 11, 1921 (US)
- Running time: 6 reels
- Country: United States
- Language: Silent (English intertitles)

At the Stage Door, also known by its working title Women of Conquest, is a lost 1921 American silent romantic drama film directed by Christy Cabanne. It stars Billie Dove, Huntley Gordon, and Miriam Battista, and was released on December 11, 1921. The film gives a glimpse into the behind-the-scenes reality of life in the New York theater, as seen by a small town girl trying to make it in the big city. The picture received mixed reviews. This was Dove's first time on film, having moved over from the Ziegfeld Follies.

== Plot ==
Mary Matthews is the elder sister of Helen, who is the favorite of their widowed mother. Growing up, she continually has to accede to Helen's wants and preferences. However, when the selfish Helen steals Mary's fiancé, Mary leaves home to try and make a life in New York City. She gets a part as a chorus girl in a Broadway production, but refuses to give in to the wanton lifestyle so prevalent among the other dancers. One night she is being pursued by the stage manager to join the gang in going out to one of their parties, but she keeps refusing. The stage manager becomes more and more aggressive, until he is on the verge of forcing her to accompany him. Mary is saved by the intervention of Philip Pierce, the heir of a socially prominent family, who punches out the stage manager.

The two become friends, and there is a growing attraction. However, at the insistence of his friends, who feel that "all chorus girls are alike", Philip makes a dishonorable proposition to her. Afterwards he realizes his mistake and apologizes, and the two reignite their mutual attraction. He eventually proposes to her, and tells her that the following evening he will meet her and present her with an engagement ring.

However, he fails to show up at the rendezvous, and in the papers the next morning there is an announcement of his engagement to a wealthy socialite. Mary is crushed. That night, despondent over being let down once again, she is on the verge of giving in and accompanying "the gang" on one of their licentious evenings out. Philip arrives just in time to prevent her from making a mistake. He explains that he missed the rendezvous because he indeed went to see his fiancée, who had arrived home unexpectedly from Europe. But he went to see her to break off their engagement, so that he could marry Mary. Unfortunately, Philip's mother jumped the gun on the wedding announcement. The two are reconciled and are married.

== Cast ==
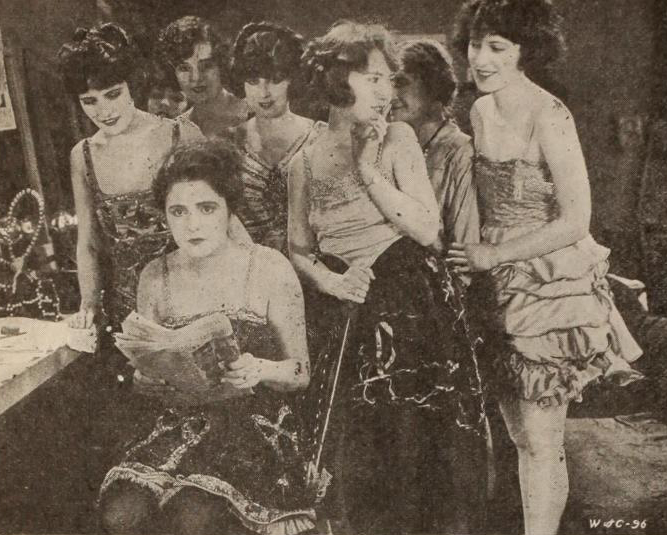
Billie Dove (seated) along with the rest of the chorus girls

- Frances Hess as Helen Mathews
- Elizabeth North as Helen Mathews, later
- Miriam Battista as Mary Mathews
- Billie Dove as Mary Mathews, later
- Margaret Foster as Mrs. Mathews
- William Collier Jr. as Arthur Bates
- Carlton Griffin as George Andrews (credited as C. Elliott Griffin)
- Myrtle Maughan as Grace Mortimer
- Charles Craig as John Brooks
- Vivia Ogden as Mrs. Reade (credited as Viva Ogden)
- Billy Quirk as Harold Reade
- Huntley Gordon as Philip Pierce
- Katherine Spencer as Alice Vincent
- Doris Eaton as Betty

== Production ==
Having left the Ziegfeld Follies shortly before, this was Billie Dove's film debut. Most of the film was shot on several sets at Robertson-Cole's West 61st Street studio in New York City, while several scenes were shot on location inside the Park Theatre, as well as outside of its stage door. The working title of the film was Women of Conquest. During filming in November, dozens of members of the press were invited on set to watch the shooting of one of the scenes. One scene shot on location in the Park Theatre included the use of over 600 extras as audience members. The film was released on December 11, 1921.

== Reception ==
Exhibitors Herald gave the picture a positive review, calling it "A rapidly moving and interesting story of a small town girl who has to give up everything for her more favored sister, and her adventures and misadventures after becoming a chorus girl." They called it one of Cabanne's best films, and praised the overall casting of the movie. They highlighted Billie Dove's acting as "brilliant", and also were impressed with Miriam Battista. They were less impressed by the cinematography, which they described as simply adequate. Variety, on the other hand, was less impressed with the picture, while finding the photography "exceptionally good." They felt the picture was over-melodramatic, and the ending somewhat farcical, lowering the overall quality of the entire film. They felt the supporting cast was adequate, but they were impressed with the comedic talents of Doris Eaton. Motion Picture News took the opposite view, holding that Cabanne's vision of New York theater life had "... all the piquancy of theatrical life to fascinate the picture public, and it has also wholesome and at times gripping drama, and plenty of human interest drama." They felt that Cabanne did not give the stereotypical picture of backstage life, but a more realistic interpretation. They felt that the cast was "well-nigh perfect" in their performances, particularly highlighting the work of Billie Dove, stating "... an actress with exactly the wistful, appealing expression needed for such a part." Their overall impression was that the film was a "delightful, absorbing story of theatrical life."

== Censorship ==
Before At the Stage Door could be exhibited in Kansas, the Kansas Board of Review required the removal of all scenes of women drinking and the intertitles "For God's sake open the door, give me a chance to prove" and "Oh God, I can't, I can't."

== Preservation ==
With no holdings located in archives, At the Stage Door is considered a lost film.
