= Poetry in Motion (arts program) =

Poetry in Motion is an arts program collaborative which displays poems by prominent authors in advertising space on the buses and subways. The program was launched by New York's Metropolitan Transportation Authority and the Poetry Society of America.

== History ==
Poetry in Motion was developed in 1992 by the Metropolitan Transportation Authority and the Poetry Society of America and aimed to make the use of New York City public transportation more enjoyable and enlightening. The program was originally based on the British Council program Poems on the Underground, and was launched to reach the nearly 7 million daily commuters of New York City.

The first set of poems was "Crossing Brooklyn Ferry" by Walt Whitman, "Hope is the Thing with Feathers" by Emily Dickinson, "When You Are Old" by William Butler Yeats, and "Let There Be New Flowering" by Lucille Clifton. Since then, poems by more than 100 different authors have been featured.

== Expansion ==
Originally designed for New York's MTA system, Poetry in Motion expanded to cities including:

- 1996 - Chicago and Boston
- 1997 - Baltimore and Portland, Oregon
- 1998 - Dallas, Los Angeles, Atlanta, and Washington, D.C.
- 1999 - Philadelphia
- 2000 - Pioneer Valley, Austin, Fort Collins, Houston, and Ohio State University's public transportation.

Poetry in Motion also appeared in Milwaukee, New Orleans, Salt Lake City, St. Louis, as well as Boise, Idaho; Denver, Colorado; Fresno, California; Hartford, Connecticut; Jacksonville, Florida; and Little Rock, Arkansas. At peak, Poetry in Motion reached 13 million commuters daily in 14 American cities.

The program was launched statewide in Rhode Island in 2017.

== Poetry in Motion awards ==
Poetry in Motion has received numerous awards for design and utility, including:

- The New York Press Club’s "Heart of New York Award" – 1994
- The Municipal Art Society’s Certificate of Merit – 1994 (Awarded jointly to Poetry in Motion and Arts for Transit)
- A proclamation from the Council of the City of New York that honored Poetry in Motion for its "invaluable contribution to the people of New York City" – 2000

== Poetry in Motion publications ==
Poetry In Motion: 100 Poems from the Buses and Subways was published by W.W. Norton in 1996 and was selected as a Best Book for Young Adults by the Young Adult Library Services Association and the American Library Association.

Poetry In Motion From Coast to Coast was published by W.W. Norton in 2002 and includes 120 selections from buses and subways across the country. The book was noted praiseworthy "for its populist approach to poetry."

The Best of Poetry in Motion: Celebrating 25 Years on Subways and Buses by Alice Quinn with a foreword by Billy Collins was published by W. W. Norton & Company in 2017. ISBN 978-0-393-60937-0

== Poetry in Motion today ==
In the Spring of 2009, Poetry in Motion was temporarily suspended in New York. The Poetry Society of America will relaunch the NYC branch in the summer of 2010, returning poems to the city bus system. Today the program is active in Dallas, Denver, St. Louis, and Los Angeles, as well as several Canadian cities.
