= Humoreske (Schumann) =

1839 piano piece by Robert Schumann

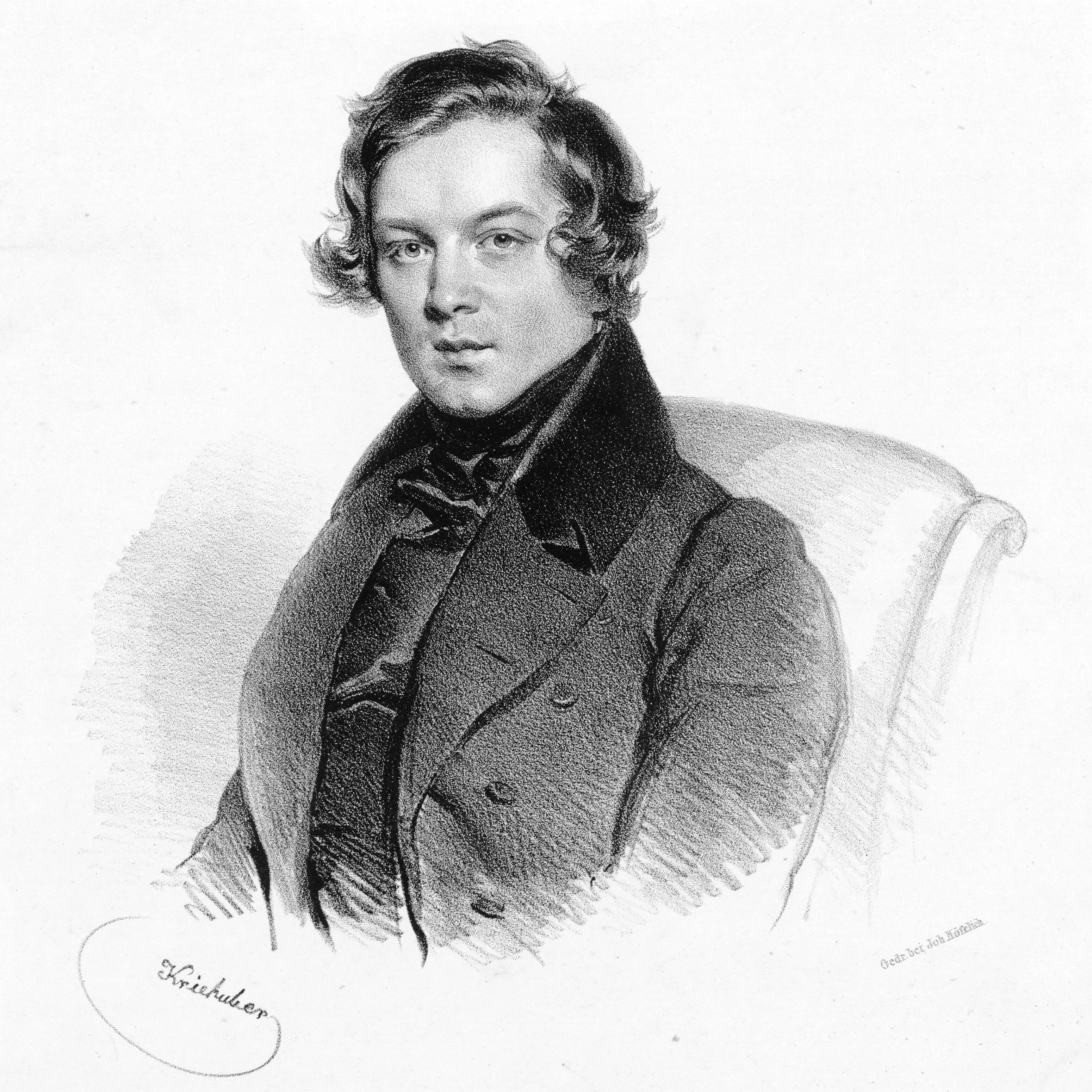
Robert Schumann in 1839

Humoreske in B♭ major, Op. 20, is a piano piece by Robert Schumann, composed in 1839 and dedicated to Julie von Webenau. Schumann cited Jean Paul's style of humour as source of inspiration, although there are no direct programmatic links to Jean Paul's oeuvre found in the piece.

== Structure ==
The Humoreske consists of seven sections (not originally indicated as such by the composer except for the last one, "Zum Beschluss"), to be played attacca after each other. Although the piece is nominally written in B♭ major, most of the piece is set in B♭ major's relative minor key, G minor. The musical texture and emotional tone, though, varies widely and differs greatly between the sections:

1. "Einfach" (Simple) (B♭ major,, M. M. = 80)
  "Sehr rasch und leicht" (Very fast and light) (B♭ major, 2/4, M. M. = 138)
  "Noch rascher" (Even faster) (G minor)
  "Erstes Tempo", Wie im Anfang (First tempo, as in the beginning) (B♭ major,)
2. "Hastig" (Hastily) (G minor, 2/4, M. M. = 126)
  "Nach und nach immer lebhafter und stärker" (Gradually more lively and stronger) (D minor)
  "Wie vorher" (As previously) Adagio
3. "Einfach und zart" (Simple and delicate) (G minor,, M. M. = 100)
  "Intermezzo" (B♭ major, 2/4, M. M. = 100)
4. "Innig" (Heartfelt) (B♭ major,, M. M. = 116)
  "Schneller" (Quicker) (Tempo I)
5. "Sehr lebhaft" (Very lively) (G-minor/B♭ major, 2/4, M. M. = 76)
  "Immer lebhafter" (Increasingly lively) Stretto
6. "Mit einigem Pomp" (With some pomp) (modulating,, M. M. = 92)
7. "Zum Beschluss" (To the resolution) (B♭ major,, M. M. = 112 ) Allegro

A typical performance is about 27 minutes long. It is less popular with audiences than with pianists, and Robert Cummings wrote that some musicologists view it as an ill-judged attempt by Schumann to "take his formula in Kreisleriana a step further." However, it has been championed by critics such as Judith Chernaik and John C. Tibbetts (who consider Humoreske among Schumann's greatest pieces) as well as Anthony Tommasini, who referred to it as one of Schumann’s "most astonishing, and most overlooked, piano works".

== Sources ==
- Robert Schumann: Sämtliche Klavierwerke, vol. IV, Breitkopf & Härtel, Wiesbaden 1988, pp. 1–29.
