= Humoresque (1919 short story) =

Short story by Frannie Hurst

Humoresque: A Laugh on Life with a Tear Behind It is a 1919 short story by Fannie Hurst. It debuted in Cosmopolitan in March that year and later that year was published in the collection Humoresque and Other Stories. The plot focuses on a tale of young Jewish violinist caught between ghetto and salon.

It was adapted into stage plays (1923, directed by J. Hartley Manners) and films (1920, directed by Frank Borzage; 1946, directed by Jean Negulesco) of the same name.

== See also ==
- Humoresque (literature)
