= The Good Provider =

1922 film by Frank Borzage

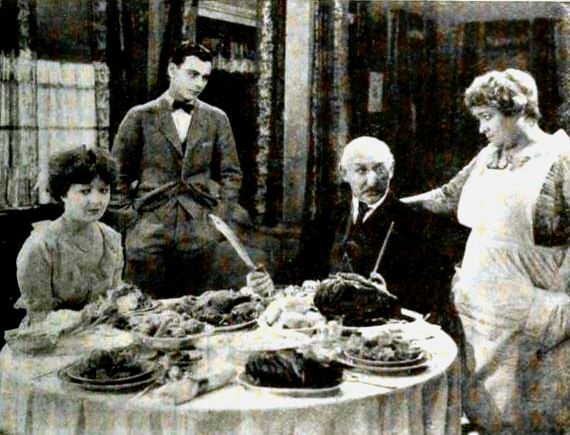
- Vivienne Osborne (left), William Collier, Jr., Dore Davidson, and Vera Gordon
- Directed by: Frank Borzage
- Screenplay by: Fannie Hurst; John Lynch
- Starring: Vera Gordon; Dore Davidson; Miriam Battista; Vivienne Osborne; William Collier, Jr. John Roche; Ora Jones
- Cinematography: Chester A. Lyons
- Production company: Cosmopolitan Productions
- Distributed by: Paramount Pictures
- Release date: April 2, 1922
- Running time: 80 minutes
- Country: United States
- Language: Silent (English intertitles)

The Good Provider is a 1922 American silent drama film directed by Frank Borzage and written by Fannie Hurst and John Lynch. The film stars Vera Gordon, Dore Davidson, Miriam Battista, Vivienne Osborne, William Collier, Jr., John Roche, and Ora Jones. The film was released on April 2, 1922, by Paramount Pictures. It is not known whether the film currently survives.

== Plot ==
As described in a film magazine, Julius Binswanger has at last managed to save enough to send for his wife Becky and two children Pearl and Izzy who have spent their time since leaving their hovel in Russia in a place little better, the swarming tenements in the East Side of New York City. He meets them at the tiny train station in a little town about forty five minutes from the city, and they are overwhelmed by the home he has bought as a surprise, a rickety old home at the edge of the village, but still their very own home. Over the next few years Julius prospers.

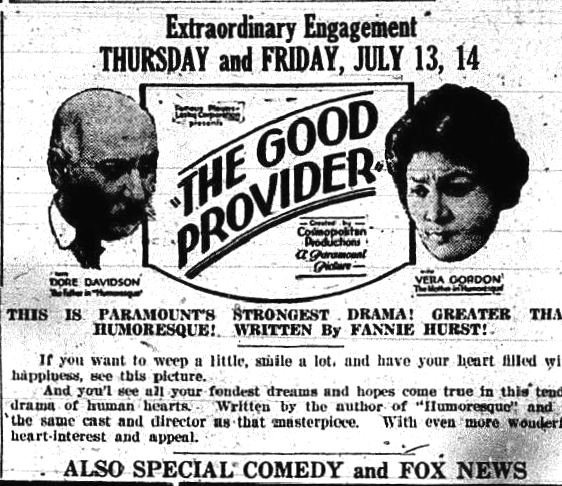
Advertisement

Within ten years the traveling peddler's wagon of his has been replaced by a neat store on Main Street, and the home has been repaired and has an air of comfort and prosperity. Pearl has grown into womanhood and has a prospective lover in Max Teitlebaum, while Izzy is an up-to-date youth eager to have "his chance." He and his sister want to move back to New York City, but their father refuses. The mother is torn between her love for her husband and her desire to give their children "their chance." At last the old man, much against his will, yields and they move back into the city, renting their home. This move proves to be ruinous to the father, and he ends up bankrupt with his family knowing this truth. Pearl knows Max is planning to propose to her, but she demurs for her family. Julius feels he must make any sacrifice for those he loves. He has not been sleeping well, and takes the maximum dosage of two pills to assist in this. Becky discovers her husband just as he is about to take six of these pills, and this causes a readjustment for everyone. Max, as Pearl's fiancé, insists on putting money into the business, and Izzy takes charge of the store. Julius returns to the little house he loves, and the final scenes show him and Becky comfortable and happy in their own home and Pearl and Max happily married.

== Cast ==
- Vera Gordon as Becky Binswanger
- Dore Davidson as Julius Binswanger
- Vivienne Osborne as Pearl Binswanger
  - Miriam Battista as Pearl Binswanger, as a child
- William Collier, Jr. as Izzy Binswanger
- John Roche as Max Teitlebaum
- Ora Jones as Mrs. Teitlebaum
- Eddie Phillips as Broadway Sport
- Muriel Martin as Flapper
- James Devine as Mr. Boggs
- Blanche Craig as Mrs. Boggs
- Margaret Severn as Specialty Dancer
