= Six Humoresques =

Six concertante pieces by Jean Sibelius

- Concertante pieces by Jean Sibelius
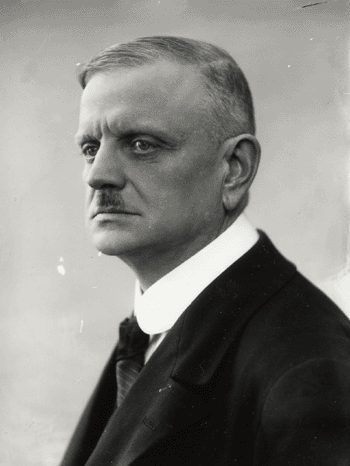
- The composer (c. 1918)
- Opus: 87 & 89
- Composed: 1917–1918; No. 1 rev. 1940
- Publisher: Hansen (1922–1923, Nos. 2–6; 1942, No. 1)
- Duration: 22.5 mins.

Premiere
- Date: 24 November 1919
- Location: Helsinki, Finland
- Conductor: Jean Sibelius
- Performers: Helsinki Philharmonic Orchestra; Paul Cherkassky (violin)

The Six Humoresques, Opp. 87 and 89, (Note: The four Op. 89 humoresques are typically designated with the letters a–d. However, this article follows the Urtext Edition (2016) of the Six Humoresques, which utilizes the numbers 1–4. Thus, for example, the Humoresque No. 3 in G minor, Op. 89/a, becomes Op. 89/1.) are concertante compositions for violin and orchestra written from 1917 to 1918 by the Finnish composer Jean Sibelius. Despite spanning two opus numbers (due to publishing technicalities), the composer—who originally considered calling the humoresques impromptus or lyrical dances—intended them as a suite. They are the:

- Humoresque No. 1 in D minor, Op. 87/1. Commodo
- Humoresque No. 2 in D major, Op. 87/2. Allegro assai
- Humoresque No. 3 in G minor, Op. 89/1. Alla gavotta
- Humoresque No. 4 in G minor, Op. 89/2. Andantino
- Humoresque No. 5 in E-flat major, Op. 89/3. Commodo
- Humoresque No. 6 in G minor, Op. 89/4. Allegro

The Six Humoresques premiered on 24 November 1919 in Helsinki, with Sibelius conducting the Helsinki Philharmonic Orchestra; the soloist was the Russian-Finnish-American violinist Paul Cherkassky. Also on the program was the definitive version of the Symphony No. 5 in E-flat major (Op. 82), as well as Song of the Earth (Op. 93), a cantata for mixed choir.

In the autumn of 1940, Sibelius revised No. 1's instrumentation (most notably, he eliminated the harp part); the original, while promised to Wilhelm Hansen in February 1917, was never published. The violinist Arvo Hannikainen premiered the revised No. 1 on 15 December 1940, with Toivo Haapanen conducting the Helsinki Philharmonic Orchestra. Hansen, who had published the other five humoresques in 1923, completed the set in 1942. The 1917 version is extant.

== Instrumentation ==
The Humoresque No. 1 is scored for the following instruments:

- Soloist: violin
- Woodwinds: 2 flutes, 2 oboes, 2 clarinets (in B♭), and 2 bassoons
- Brass: 2 horns (in F)
- Percussion: timpani
- Strings: violins, violas, cellos, and double basses

The Humoresque No. 2 has identical scoring, except for the omission of the entire woodwind section. The Op. 89 pieces are even more delicately scored. In addition to the soloist, Humoresques Nos. 3 and 4 utilize strings only. No. 5 adds to this scoring three woodwinds: 2 flutes, 2 clarinets (in B♭), and 2 bassoons, while No. 6 omits the clarinets but retains the flutes and bassoons.

== Recordings ==
The sortable table below lists commercially available recordings of the complete Six Humoresques:

No.	Conductor	Orchestra	Soloist	Rec. (Note: Refers to the year in which the performers recorded the work; this may not be the same as the year in which the recording was first released to the general public.)	Time	Recording venue	Label	Ref.
1	Tibor Szöke	Southwest German Radio Symphony Orchestra	Aaron Rosand	c. 1957	17:10	[Unknown]	Vox	(Note: T. Szöke–Vox (PL 11.600) 1959)
2	Paavo Berglund	Finnish Radio Symphony Orchestra (1)	Heimo Haitto	1964	20:47	YLE	Finlandia Classics	(Note: P. Berglund–Finlandia (FINCLA 2) 2013)
3	Sir Colin Davis	London Symphony Orchestra	Salvatore Accardo	1979	20:27	All Saints' Church, Tooting	Decca	(Note: C. Davis–Decca (Eloquence 482 5097) 2016)
4	Charles Dutoit	Philharmonia Orchestra	Pierre Amoyal	1979	20:43	EMI Recording Studios	Erato	(Note: C. Dutoit–Erato (0630–12746–2) 1995)
5	Vernon Handley	Radio-Symphonie-Orchester Berlin	Ralph Holmes	1980	20:18	Jesus-Christus-Kirche, Berlin	Schwann, Koch	(Note: V. Handley–Koch-Schwann (CD 311 003 F1) 1988)
6	Juhani Lamminmäki	Tapiola Sinfonietta (1)	Leonidas Kavakos	1989	21:53	Tapiola Hall, Espoo Cultural Centre	Finlandia	(Note: J. Lamminmäki–Finlandia (4509–95859–2) 1991)
7	Neeme Järvi	Gothenburg Symphony Orchestra	Dong-Suk Kang	1989	20:17	Gothenburg Concert Hall	BIS	(Note: N. Järvi–BIS (CD–472) 1990)
8	Jukka-Pekka Saraste	Finnish Radio Symphony Orchestra (2)	Joseph Swensen	1990	20:53	Kulttuuritalo	RCA Red Seal	(Note: J. Saraste–RCA Red Seal (19439704812 (8)) 2020)
9	Thomas Dausgaard	Danish National Symphony Orchestra	Christian Tetzlaff	2002	18:41	Danish Radio Concert Hall (old)	Virgin Classics	(Note: T. Dausgaard–Virgin Classics (7243 5 45534 2 4) 2002)
10	Hannu Koivula	Västerås Sinfonietta	Cecilia Zilliacus	2004	22:06	Västerås Konserthus	Intim Musik	(Note: C. Zilliacus - Intim Musik (IMCD 093) 2004)
11	Pekka Kuusisto	Tapiola Sinfonietta (2)	Pekka Kuusisto	2006	20:50	Tapiola Hall, Espoo Cultural Centre	Ondine	(Note: P. Kuusisto–Ondine (ODE 1074–5) 2006)
12	Bjarte Engeset	Dala Sinfonietta	Henning Kraggerud	2011	19:54	Kristinehallen, Falun	Naxos	(Note: B. Engeset–Naxos (8.572827) 2012)
13	Alejandro Garrido Porras	Orquestra Vigo 430	Nicolas Dautricourt	2014	22:43	Martín Códax Auditorium, Vigo Conservatory of Music	La Dolce Volta	(Note: A. Garrido Porras–La Dolce Volta (LDV 23) 2015)
14	John Carewe	Bournemouth Symphony Orchestra	Efi Christodoulou	2014	20:37	Lighthouse, Poole	Somm	(Note: J. Carewe–Somm (SOMMCD 0153) 2015)
15	George Vass	BBC National Orchestra of Wales	Fenella Humphreys	2020	20:48	BBC Hoddinott Hall	Resonus Classics	(Note: G. Vass–Resonus (RES10277) 2021)
16	Sir Edward Gardner	Bergen Philharmonic Orchestra	James Ehnes	2023	20:21	Grieg Hall	Chandos	(Note: E. Gardner–Chandos (CHAN 5267) 2024)

== Notes, references, and sources ==
Notes

Sources

- Barnett, Andrew (2007). Sibelius. New Haven: Yale University Press. ISBN 978-0-300-11159-0.
- Dahlström, Fabian [in Swedish] (2003). Jean Sibelius: Thematisch-bibliographisches Verzeichnis seiner Werke [Jean Sibelius: A Thematic Bibliographic Index of His Works] (in German). Wiesbaden: Breitkopf & Härtel. ISBN 3-7651-0333-0.
- Eskola, Jari (2016). Jean Sibelius: Six Humoresques for Violin and Orchestra, Opp. 87 & 89. Translated by Jaako; Mäntyjärvi (Urtext ed.). Painojussit, Kerava: Fennica Gehrman. ISMN 979-0-55011-261-2.
- Tawaststjerna, Erik (2008) [1978/1988; trans. 1997]. Sibelius: Volume III, 1914–1957. Translated by Layton, Robert. London: Faber and Faber. ISBN 978-0-571-24774-5.
