= Helen Kim (actress) =

American actress

- Born: 1907; Baltimore, Maryland, US
- Died: April 24, 1937 (aged 29–30); Manhattan, New York, US
- Occupation: Actress
- Spouses: James Mont; Randolph J. Thomson (divorced)

Helen Kim (1907-1937) was an American actress who worked on Broadway and in radio in the 1920s and 1930s.

== Beginnings and career ==
Kim was born in Baltimore, Maryland, to William June Kim and Lillian Turner. Her father was Korean, and her mother was Euro-American. After being raised in New York City with her two siblings, Kim attended the University of California at Berkeley. She soon began appearing in Broadway plays like Roar China and The Gilded Princess.

== Personal life ==
Kim made headlines in 1930 when a poet she had been dating, Robert Carroll Pew, committed suicide in front of her by drinking poison. She later married Randolph J. Thomson, who represented himself as a wealthy British theatrical producer, but he ended up being a fraud. The same day she secured a divorce from Thomson, she married her second husband, interior designer James Mont, who is associated with the Hollywood Regency craze of the 1940s and 1950s.

== Death ==
Twenty-nine days after marrying Mont, Kim committed suicide in her Manhattan apartment's kitchen by inhaling gas. At the time, partygoers had gathered in her building for a murder mystery party thrown by another tenant, and journalists mistakenly reported that Helen had planned the affair.

== Selected Broadway credits ==
- Roar China
- The Gilded Princess
- The Shanghai Gesture
