= Miriam Battista =

American actress (1912–1980)

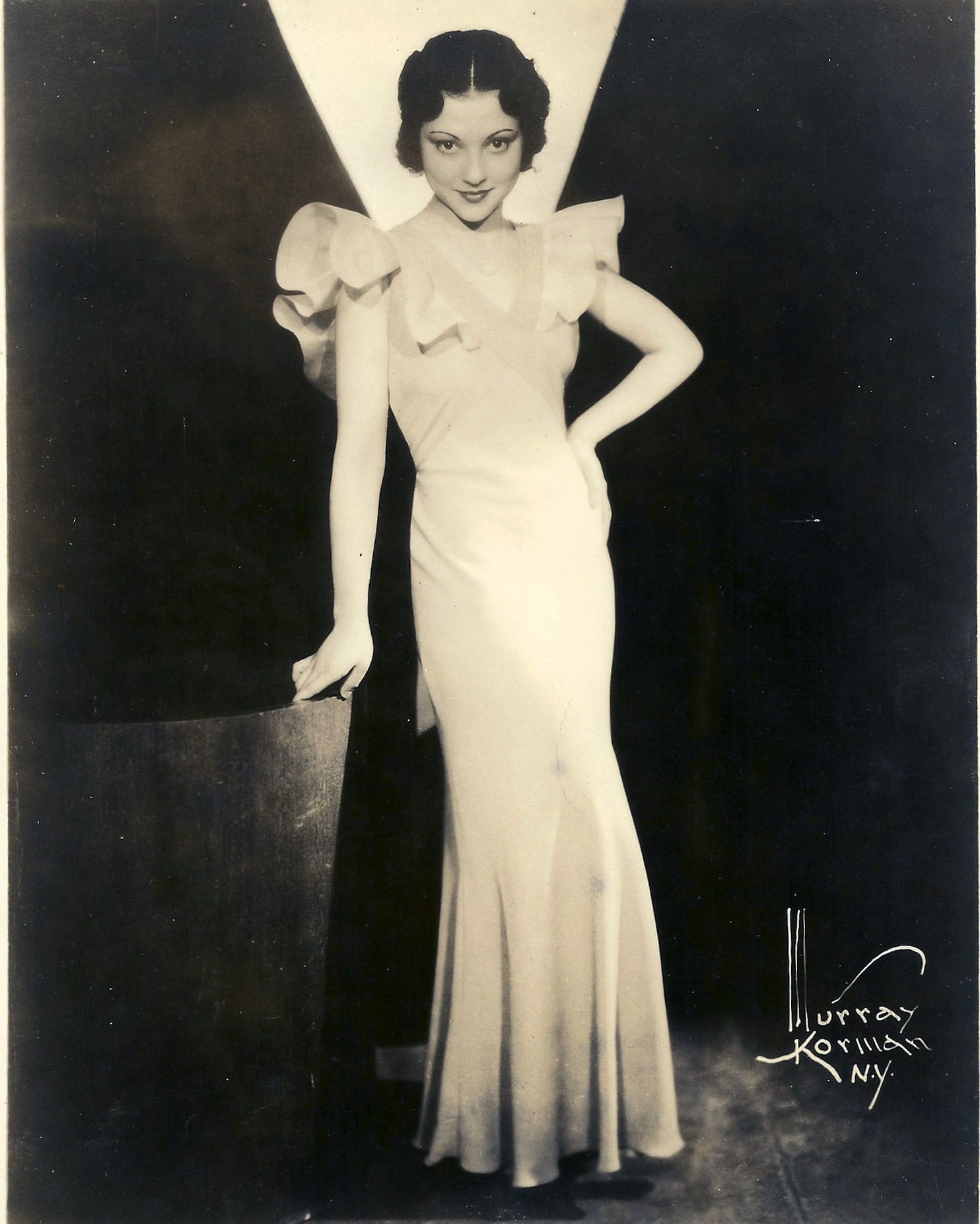
- Miriam Battista in 1932
- Born: July 14, 1912; New York City, U.S.
- Died: December 22, 1980 (aged 68); New York City, U.S.
- Occupations: Actress, writer
- Years active: 1916–1948
- Spouses: Paul Pierce (m. 1934; div. 1935) Russell Maloney (m. 1938; died 1948) Lloyd Rosamond (m. 1948; died 1964)
- Children: 1

Miriam Battista (July 14, 1912 – December 22, 1980) was an American actress known principally for her early career as a child star in silent films. After gaining notice in Broadway theatre at the age of four, she was cast in films the same year. Her most famous appearance was in the 1920 film Humoresque in which she played a little girl on crutches. As an adult, Battista acted in Italian-language films in the 1930s, and she appeared in Broadway productions. She wrote, sang, composed music, and co-hosted a television talk show with her second husband.

== Early life and career ==
Miriam Caramella Josephine Battista was born in 1912 in New York City to Raphael Battista and Cleonice "Clara" Rufolo, both Italian immigrants. She began performing in 1916 at the age of four in A Kiss for Cinderella, a Broadway play starring Maude Adams, in which Battista had an uncredited role as the youngest of a group of war orphans. Other Broadway appearances followed, including small roles in Daddy Long Legs with Henry Miller in 1917, A Doll's House with Alla Nazimova in 1918, and Daddies with Jeanne Eagels in 1919.

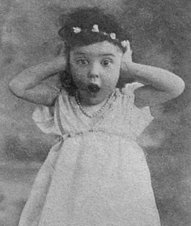
Battista in 1916

At the same time that Battista appeared on the stage, she began also to get work in silent films. She had an uncredited role in the Virginia Pearson vamp vehicle Blazing Love (1916), which resulted in Battista being featured, with a photo and brief biography, in an article entitled "Little Stars" in the film magazine Moving Picture Stories. Her first credited film role came in 1918 in Nazimova's Eye for Eye, playing an Arab sheik's daughter, the little sister of Nazimova's sultry character, which led to Battista being cast by director Frank Borzage as the physically disabled Minnie Ginsberg in Humoresque (1920). Author Elinor Glyn was so impressed by Battista's performance that she wrote an ultimately unproduced screenplay for this child star whom she called "the greatest actress of the screen." Reporters began to describe Battista as two years younger than she really was, saying that she was born in 1914.

Motion Picture Magazine dedicated an article to Battista in December 1922, called "Woman of the World". In it, reporter Gladys Hall noted Battista's precocious maturity, a preference for jade jewelry over dolls, and characteristics of a vamp-in-the-making. In 1924, her photo appeared on the cover of Picture Show, a UK publication, showing her astride a tipped-over barrel with the story title "They really play in Pictures" and the caption "Miriam Battista enjoys a romp".

After her success in Humoresque, Battista appeared in nine more silent films, often in roles that called for her to cry on camera, a skill for which she became noted. She made public appearances to promote her films and also toured the vaudeville circuit, playing Juliet in the balcony scene from Romeo and Juliet with child actor Charles Eaton. After her mother's death in 1924, her career stalled.

== Adult career ==
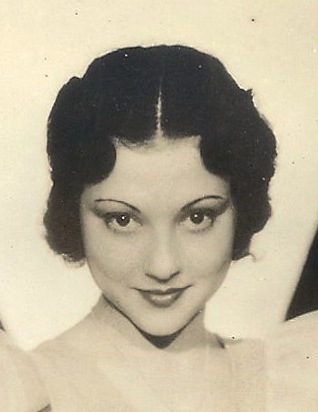
Miriam Battista in 1932, photo by Murray Korman

In 1931, Battista took leading roles in several Italian-language films made in New York, including Santa Lucia Luntana and Così è la vita. She also returned to the Broadway stage, appearing in The Honor Code in 1931. Among other Broadway appearances during the next decade, she had a singing role in the Ziegfeld musical Hot-Cha! with Bert Lahr, a part playing opposite Humphrey Bogart in Our Wife, and she enjoyed an unusually long run in the comedy No More Ladies. She was generally unlucky in the Broadway productions she chose, which usually ran for only a few performances. However, she found frequent work in summer stock and in the road companies of successful Broadway productions such as The Women.

In 1934, Battista married dancer Paul Pierce. They divorced slightly over a year later in 1935. In 1938, she eloped with writer Russell Maloney. Battista's writing talent was recognized when The New Yorker published her short story "No Sugar Please" in the April 20, 1940 issue. She and Maloney had a daughter, Amelia, in 1945. Battista helped Maloney translate Die Fledermaus into English for the Philadelphia Opera Company (1943), and they collaborated on a television talk show, The Maloneys, on the DuMont Television Network (1947–1948). The two wrote the scenario and lyrics for a musical, Sleepy Hollow (with the scenery of Washington Irving's "Legend"), which cost $230,000 to produce but ran for only 12 performances (June 3, 1948 – June 12, 1948).

== Death ==
Battista's second husband died in September 1948. Three months later she married Lloyd Rosamond, a radio producer and long-time friend. Her daughter and she moved with him to Los Angeles, California, in 1960, where he died in 1964. Miriam Battista returned to her native New York City, where she died at Jewish Memorial Hospital in Manhattan from complications of emphysema on December 22, 1980, aged 68.

== Appearances ==
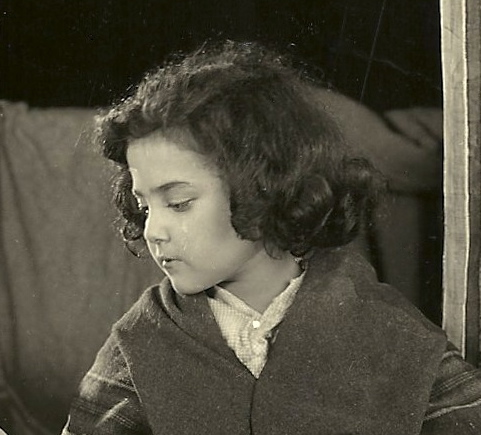
Battista as Minnie Ginsberg in Humoresque, 1920

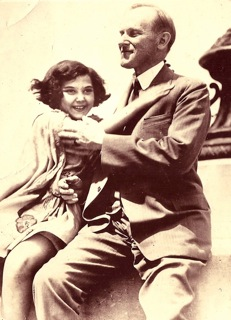
Battista with President Calvin Coolidge, 1923

- 1916 – A Kiss for Cinderella (play)
- 1916 – Blazing Love (film)
- 1917 – Daddy Long Legs (play)
- 1918 – A Doll's House (play)
- 1918 – Freedom (play)
- 1918 – Eye for Eye (film)
- 1919 – Daddies (play)
- 1919 – Papa (play)
- 1919 – The Red Dawn (play)
- 1920 – Humoresque (film)
- 1921 – At the Stage Door (film)
- 1922 – The Good Provider (film)
- 1922 – The Blonde Vampire (film)
- 1922 – Boomerang Bill (film)
- 1922 – The Curse of Drink (film)
- 1922 – The Man Who Played God (film)
- 1922 – Smilin' Through (film)
- 1923 – The Custard Cup (film)
- 1923 – The Steadfast Heart (film)
- 1924 – Romeo and Juliet (play)
- 1931 – Santa Lucia Luntana (film)
- 1931 – Così è la vita (film)
- 1931 – The Honor Code (play)
- 1932 – Hot-Cha! (play)
- 1933 – Saint Wench (play)
- 1933 – Our Wife (play)
- 1933 – An Undesirable Lady (play)
- 1934 – No More Ladies (play)
- 1934 – Enlighten Thy Daughter (film)
- 1934 – Fools Rush In (play)
- 1935 – Tapestry in Gray (play)
- 1936 – Summer Wives (play)
- 1936 – Prelude to Exile (play)
- 1939 – They Knew What They Wanted (play)
- 1948 – Sleepy Hollow (credited as playwright and librettist)
- 1947–1948 – The Maloneys (television)
