= Dore Davidson =

American actor (1851–1930)

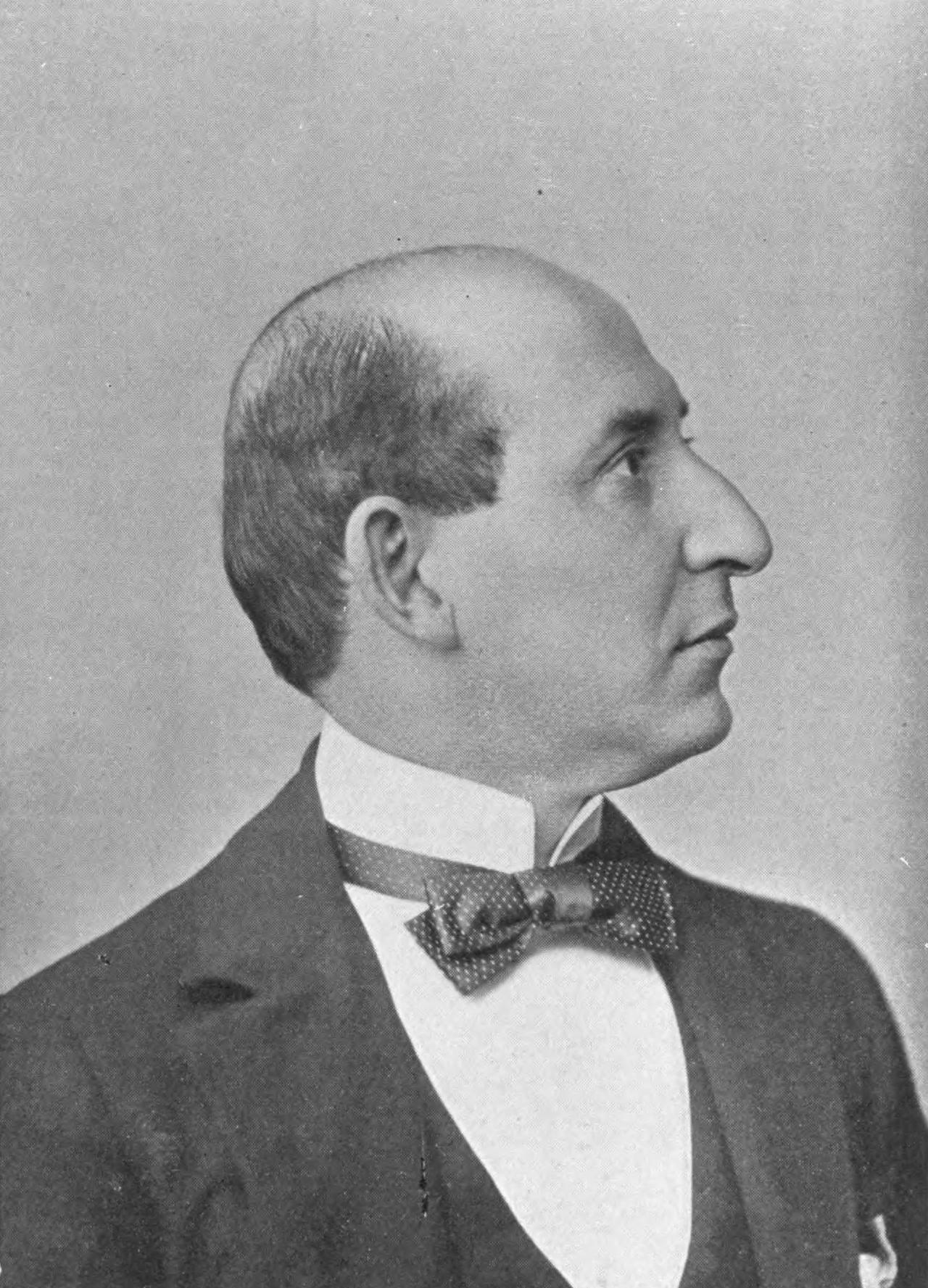
- Born: October 16, 1851; New York City, U.S.
- Died: March 7, 1930 (aged 78); New York City, U.s.
- Occupations: Actor; author; producer
- Years active: 1916–1927 (film)

Dore Davidson (1851–March 7, 1930) was an American stage actor and a film actor during the silent era. He was also an author and producer.

Davidson was active in Yiddish theater before he began performing on Broadway. Broadway plays in which he appeared included Rollo's Wild Oat (1920), The Stronger Sex (1908), What the Butler Saw (1906), Mademoiselle Marni (1905), The Judgement of King Solomon (1902), To Have and to Hold (1901), and Humanity (1895).

On March 7, 1930, Davidson died in Kings Park Hospital at age 79.

== Selected filmography ==
- Stolen Orders (1918)
- Joan of the Woods (1918)
- Humoresque (1920)
- The Daughter Pays (1920)
- The Light in the Dark (1922)
- The Good Provider (1922)
- The Rosary (1922)
- Your Best Friend (1922)
- Success (1923)
- Broadway Broke (1923)
- The Purple Highway (1923)
- None So Blind (1923)
- Grit (1924)
- Welcome Stranger (1924)
- The Great White Way (1924)
- That Royle Girl (1925)
- The Music Master (1927)
- East Side, West Side (1927)
