= Humoresque (1920 film) =

1920 film by Frank Borzage

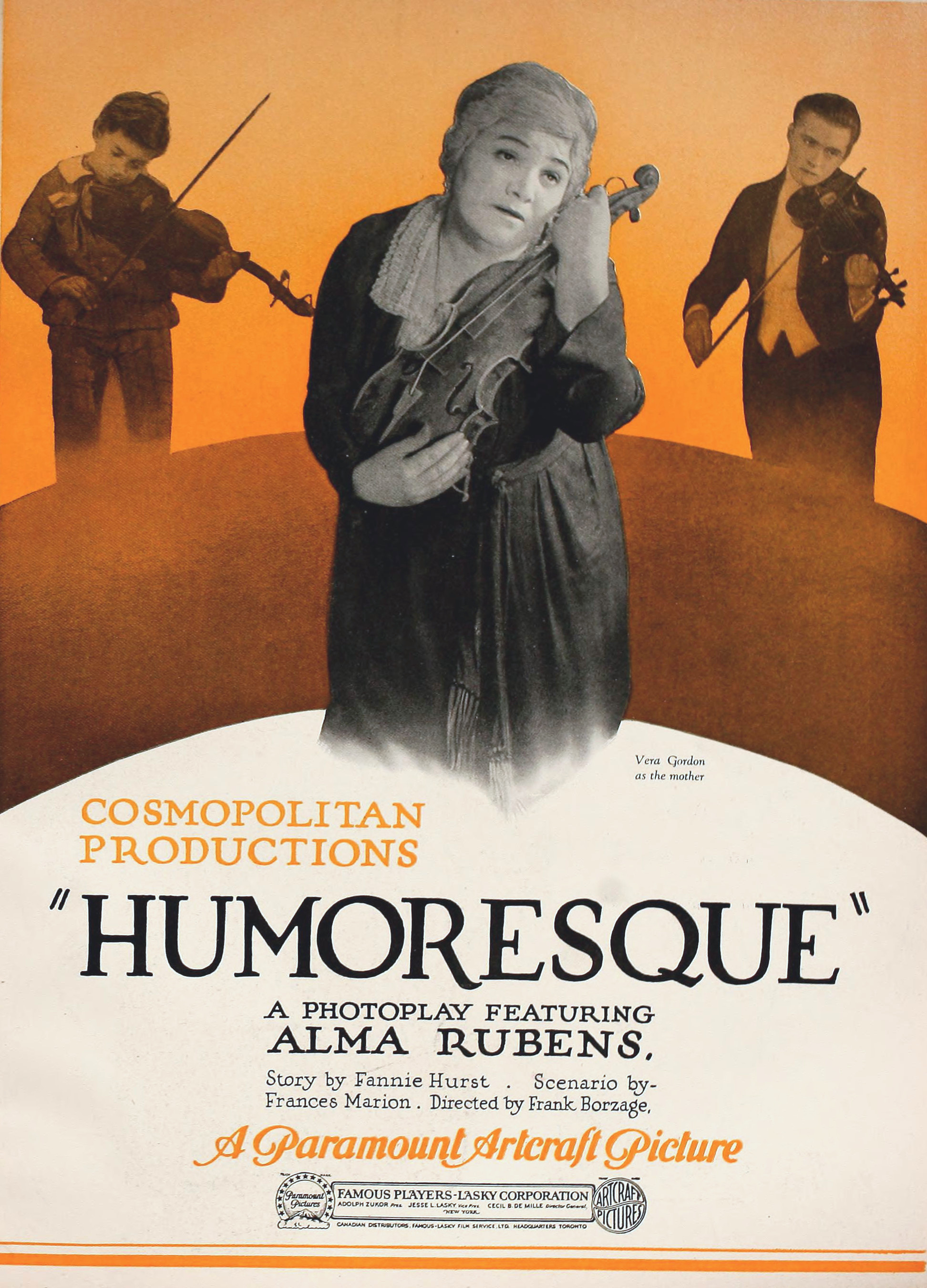
- Advertisement for the film, 1920
- Directed by: Frank Borzage
- Written by: William LeBaron; Frances Marion
- Story by: Fannie Hurst
- Based on: Humoresque: A Laugh on Life with a Tear Behind It; 1919 story in Cosmopolitan by Fannie Hurst
- Produced by: William Randolph Hearst (uncredited)
- Starring: Gaston Glass; Vera Gordon; Bobby Connelly; Alma Rubens
- Cinematography: Gilbert Warrenton
- Music by: Hugo Riesenfeld
- Production company: Cosmopolitan Productions
- Distributed by: Famous Players–Lasky; Paramount Pictures
- Release date: May 30, 1920 (United States)
- Running time: 71 minutes
- Country: United States
- Language: Silent (English intertitles)

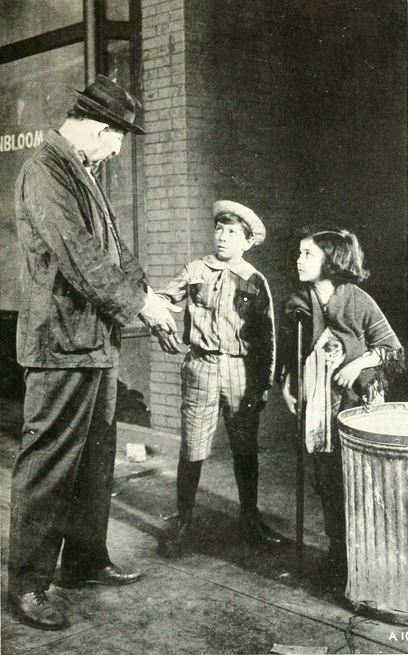
L-R: Dore Davidson, Bobby Connelly and Miriam Battista in Humoresque (1920)

Humoresque (1920)

Humoresque is a 1920 American silent drama film produced by Cosmopolitan Productions, released by Famous Players–Lasky and Paramount Pictures, and directed by Frank Borzage, from a 1919 short story by Fannie Hurst and script or scenario by Frances Marion. It follows the childhood and going to war of an immigrant family Lower East Side violinist.

This film was the first film to win the Photoplay Medal of Honor, a precursor of the Academy Award for Best Picture.

In 2015, the United States Library of Congress selected the film for preservation in the National Film Registry, finding it "culturally, historically, or aesthetically significant".

== Plot ==
As described in a film magazine, Leon Kantor, born in the “Ghetto” of New York City, exhibits an exquisite, inherent musical ability that culminates in him becoming a famous violinist. He is born into a Jewish family with many siblings, a loving mother (Sarah Kantor), and a stingy father (Abrahm Kantor). Early scenes in the film depict their family's poor living conditions as well as Leon's childhood in the squalor of New York, including interactions with grimy playmates and his female friend, Gina Ginsberg, who later becomes his romantic interest.

On his ninth birthday, Leon accompanies his father to a store, where he notices a four-dollar violin that sparks his interest. When Abrahm sees Leon interested in the violin, he tries to direct Leon to a more inexpensive music box and reprimands him when he keeps reaching for the violin. After they return home, Leon's interest in the violin is brought to his mother's attention. Sarah Kantor excitedly claims that her prayers for a musical prodigy have finally been answered and proceeds to give Leon his sibling Isadore's old violin. When Leon picks up the violin and plays, Sarah Kantor's belief in her son's musical genius is confirmed. Throughout the film, the love of Leon's mother is a significant presence in his musical journey.

In a brief cross dissolve, child Leon playing the violin is transformed into young adult Leon playing in front of the Italian royal family. In subsequent scenes, the Kantors’ lifestyle of new money from Leon's success can be seen. The Kantors have moved from the Ghetto into a stylish Fifth-Avenue home equipped with servants. Leon and Gina, now both well-off, express their romantic interests in each other. Leon and his family seem to live a comfortable life, but Leon feels unrest with the rumblings of World War I and the call for soldiers. He commits to serve in the war without his mother's knowledge and plays the song “Humoresque — that laugh on life with a tear behind it” at his last concert for his own childhood community before leaving. After the concert, Leon must turn down a lucrative playing contract and later tells his mother about his commitment to serve. Leon plays the violin for his family to bid them goodbye as he leaves home for the war and commits to pursue a relationship with Gina after he returns.

After months at war and suffering an arm injury, Leon returns to his home in New York. The doctors pronounce that normal use of his arm would be very unlikely, which breaks Leon's spirit. In one of the last scenes, Leon is sitting in an armchair, obviously distressed about his crippled arm. Gina enters the room and comes to his side, reminding him about their commitment to each other. Leon responds coldly and asks Gina to leave if she loves him, telling her not to give herself to a useless cripple without a career. Gina, heartbroken, leaves the room and collapses outside the translucent door. Leon sees her collapse and goes over to pick her up in his arms. After handing Gina over to a house servant to be placed on the sofa, he realizes that he can use his injured arm normally. He immediately begins to play the violin, whose music reaches the ears of Gina and Leon's parents. They rush over to Leon and end the film with their embraces.

== Cast ==
- Gaston Glass as Leon Kantor
- Vera Gordon as Mama Kantor
- Alma Rubens as Gina Berg (aka Minnie Ginsberg)
- Dore Davidson as Abrahm Kantor
- Bobby Connelly as Leon Kantor (child)
- Helen Connelly as Esther Kantor (child)
- Ann Wallack as Esther Kantor (adult) (credited as Ann Wallick)
- Sidney Carlyle as Mannie Kantor
- Joseph Cooper as Isadore Kantor (child)
- Maurice Levigne as Isadore Kantor (adult)
- Alfred Goldberg as Rudolph Kantor (child)
- Edward Stanton as Rudolph Kantor (adult)
- Louis Stern as Sol Ginsberg (credited as Louis Stearns)
- Maurice Peckre as Boris Kantor
- Ruth Sabin as Mrs. Isadore Kantor
- Miriam Battista as Minnie Ginsberg (child)

== Production ==
The sentimentality in the film was emphasized by director Borzage through his pioneering use of soft focus and gauze camera shots. Producer William Randolph Hearst had screenwriter Marion change the ending from Hurst's story to have a surprise happy ending, which helped make it Cosmopolitan's first successful film.

== Reception ==
Humoresque was very popular with the film going public and was praised by critics for the realism in its portrayal of New York City ghetto family life. Its success led to the release of several ghetto life films from other studios, often with a "long suffering mother" character, which included Cheated Love (1921), The Barricade (1921), The Good Provider (1922), Hungry Hearts (1922), Little Miss Smiles (1922), Solomon in Society (1922), Salome of the Tenements (1925), Souls in Exile (1926), Jake the Plumber (1927), and East Side Sadie (1929).

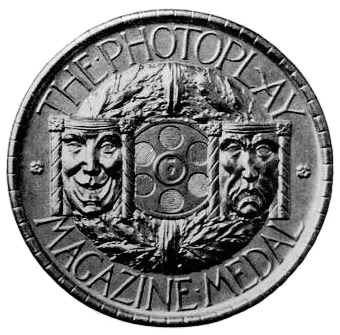
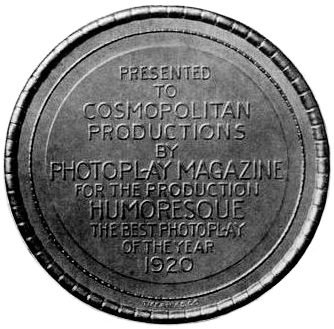
In 1921, the first Photoplay Medal of Honor was presented to Cosmopolitan Productions for Humoresque

Humoresque was the first film to receive the Photoplay Medal of Honor, the first motion picture award, preceding the Academy Awards by nine years. Recipients of the award were selected by the two million readers of Photoplay magazine.

== Preservation status ==
The film has undergone a restoration at the UCLA Film & Television Archive.
