= Humoresque (literature) =

Humoresque or humorous miniature is a very short humorous literary work (short story).

== See also ==
- Humoresque (1919 short story)
