= Barrow Poets =

Group of poets and musicians from England

The Barrow Poets or Barrow Collective were a group of poets and folk musicians formed in England in the 1950s. Their name came from their practice of selling, from a barrow, copies of works they had written or performed. Members at different times included Gerard Benson, Jim Parker, William Bealby-Wright, Christine Shotton, Cicely Smith, Heather Black, John Naylor, Susan Baker, and William Gardener. They released several folk and spoken word albums on Argo Records from 1963 to 1981, sold mostly at their own gigs. The group "performed everything from Shakespeare and Milton to limericks and risqué ballads everywhere – from the back rooms of pubs to BBC's Late Night Line-Up, around the country and in Europe and the US". "The Pheasant Plucker's Song" was an Australian Top 10 single.
