= Humoresques (Dvořák) =

Piano cycle by Antonín Dvořák

Cover of sheet music for Dvořák's Humoresques

Humoresques (Czech: Humoresky), Op. 101 (B. 187), is a piano cycle by the Czech composer Antonín Dvořák, written during the summer of 1894. Music critic David Hurwitz says "the seventh Humoresque is probably the most famous small piano work ever written after Beethoven's Für Elise."

== History ==
During his stay in the United States, when Dvořák was director of the Conservatory in New York from 1892 to 1895, the composer collected many interesting musical themes in his sketchbooks. He used some of these ideas in other compositions, notably the "New World" Symphony, the "American" String Quartet, the Quintet in E♭ major, and the Sonatina for Violin, but some remained unused.

In 1894, Dvořák spent the summer with his family in Vysoká u Příbrami in Bohemia. During this "vacation", Dvořák began to use the collected material and to compose a new cycle of short piano pieces. On 19 July 1894, Dvořák sketched the first Humoresque in B major, today number 6 in the cycle. However, the composer soon started to create scores for the pieces that were intended to be published. The score was completed on 27 August 1894.

The cycle was entitled Humoresques shortly before Dvořák sent the score to his German publisher F. Simrock. The composition was published by Simrock in the autumn of 1894.

== Structure ==
Humoresque, Op. 101, No. 7
Arranged for viola and piano (shifted up to G major)

The cycle consists of eight pieces:

1. Vivace (E♭ minor)
2. Poco andante (B major)
3. Poco andante e molto cantabile (A♭ major)
4. Poco andante (F major)
5. Vivace (A minor)
6. Poco allegretto (B major)
7. Poco lento e grazioso (G♭ major)
8. Poco andante — Vivace – Meno mosso, quasi Tempo I (B♭ minor)

The main theme of the first Humoresque was sketched in New York City on New Year's Eve 1892, with the inscription Marche funèbre. The minor theme was accompanied with the inscription "people singing in the street". The opening theme of the fourth piece was also sketched in New York, among ideas intended for the unrealized opera Hiawatha. The "American" style is also apparent in other themes of the Humoresques.

== "Passengers will please refrain..." ==
In the United States, Dvořák's Humoresque Number 7 became the setting for a series of mildly scatological humorous verses, regarding passenger train toilets, beginning: "Passengers will please refrain from flushing toilets while the train is standing in the station ..." The tune together with these words has achieved the status of a "traditional" folk song, often entitled simply "Humoresque". As with all folk art, there are many variations and innumerable verses, often describing troublesome bathroom predicaments and unlikely solutions.

A 1989 letter published in the Orlando Sentinel refers to it: "The story of Amtrak waste disposal brings to mind an amusing song of 40 to 50 years ago. I have no idea who wrote the lyrics but they were sung to the tune of Dvorak's Humoresque." This dating is consistent with the song's mention in a 1941 novel. A 2008 memoir of 1930s life on a Carolina plantation describes a railroad trip in a Pullman car and notes: "A sign over the toilet contained a memorable warning, and all of us children sang its words to the melody of Dvorak's Humoresque."

Supreme Court Justice William O. Douglas claimed that he and Yale law professor Thurman Arnold were the first to combine the humorous lyrics with Dvořák's music. Ed Cray wrote, "Sometime in the early 1930s, according to his autobiography, Go East, Young Man, William O. Douglas and fellow Yale law school professor Thurman Arnold were riding the New Haven Railroad and were inspired by a sign in the toilet. 'Thurman and I got the idea of putting these memorable words to music, and Thurman quickly came up with the musical refrain from Humoresque.'" According to this source, the actual wording of the train restroom placard was "Passengers will please refrain from flushing toilets while the train is standing in or passing through a station".

== Recordings ==
External audio
- Humoresque Op. 101, No. 7 as performed by Fritz Kreisler (violin) and Franz Rupp (piano) in 1937; via Internet Archive

- Mischa Elman and Fritz Kreisler each recorded their own violin and piano arrangements of Humoresque No. 7, both in 1910. They were released on Victor Records: catalogue numbers 74163 and 74180, respectively.
- Isaac Stern and Milton Katims recorded their own arrangements for violin and orchestra of Humoresque No. 7, in 1965 and 1973.
- Jack White recorded a lyricized version of this song for his 2018 album Boarding House Reach. The lyrics of this version were created by notorious gangster Al Capone while imprisoned in Alcatraz in the 1920s. White purchased the original manuscript written by Capone at an auction in 2017.
- Dvořák in Prague: A Celebration, released on CD by Sony in 1994 and by Kultur on DVD in 2007, includes a performance of Humoresque No. 1 by Rudolf Firkušný and a performance of Humoresque No. 7 in a version arranged by Oskar Morawetz for Itzhak Perlman (violin), Yo-Yo Ma (cello) and the Boston Symphony Orchestra, conducted by Seiji Ozawa.
