= List of films: C =

indexed lists of films
0–9	A	B	C	D	E	F
G	H	I	J–K	L	M	N–O
P	Q–R	S	T	U–V–W	X–Y–Z	

This is an alphabetical list of film articles (or sections within articles about films). It includes made for television films. See the talk page for the method of indexing used.

== C ==
- C Me Dance (2009)
- The C Word (2016)
- C-Man (1949)
- C.C. and Company (1970)
- C'est si bon (2015)
- C'mon C'mon (2021)
- C.H.O.M.P.S. (1979)
- C.H.U.D. (1984)
- C.I.D.: (1955, 1956 & 1990)
- C. I. D. (1965)
- C.R.A.Z.Y. (2005)
- C.S.A.: The Confederate States of America (2005)

=== Ca ===
- Ca-bau-kan (2002)

==== Cab ====
- Cab Calloway's Hi-De-Ho (1934)
- Cab Calloway's Jitterbug Party (1935)
- Cab No. 13 (1926)
- Cab Number 13 (1948)
- A Cab for Three (2001)
- Cabal in Kabul (2006)
- Caballo prieto azabache (1948)
- Cabaret: (1927, 1953, 1954, 1972 & 2019)
- Cabaret Balkan (1998)
- Cabaret Dancer (1986)
- Cabaret Neiges Noires (1997)
- Cabaret Paradis (2006)
- Cabaret Shangai (1950)
- Cabaret Woman (1974)
- The Cabbage Soup (1981)
- The Cabbie (2000)
- The Cabbie's Song (1936)
- Cabeza de Vaca (1991)
- The Cabin (2018)
- Cabin Boy (1994)
- The Cabin in the Cotton (1932)
- The Cabin Crew (2014)
- Cabin Fever series:
  - Cabin Fever: (2002 & 2016)
  - Cabin Fever 2: Spring Fever (2009)
  - Cabin Fever: Patient Zero (2014)
- The Cabin in the Mountains (2014)
- The Cabin Movie (2005)
- Cabin Pressure (2002)
- Cabin in the Sky (1943)
- The Cabin in the Woods (2012)
- The Cabinet of Caligari (1962)
- The Cabinet of Doctor Larifari (1930)
- The Cabinet of Dr. Caligari: (1920 & 2005)
- The Cabinet of Dr. Ramirez (1991)
- The Cabinet of Jan Svankmajer (1984)
- The Cabining (2014)
- Cabiria (1914)
- The Cable Guy (1996)
- Cabrini (2024)

==== Cac–Cak ====
- Caccia al tesoro (2017)
- Caccia all'uomo (1961)
- Cacería (2002)
- Caché (2005)
- Cachito (1996)
- Cactus (1986)
- Cactus (2008)
- Cactus Flower (1969)
- The Cactus Kid (1921)
- The Cactus Kid (1930)
- The Cactus Kid (1935)
- Cactus Makes Perfect (1942)
- Cada quién su lucha (1966)
- Cadaver: (2020 & 2022)
- Cadavere a spasso (1965)
- Cadavres (2009)
- Caddie (1976)
- Caddo Lake (2024)
- The Caddy (1953)
- Caddyshack (1980)
- Caddyshack II (1988)
- Cade: The Tortured Crossing (2023)
- Cadence (1990)
- Cadet (2024)
- Cadet 1947 (2021)
- Cadet Girl (1941)
- Cadet Holiday (1951)
- Cadet Kelly (2002 TV)
- Cadet Love (1942)
- Cadet Rousselle (1954)
- Cadets (1939)
- Cadets on Parade (1942)
- Cadets of St. Martin (1937)
- Cadillac Girls (1993)
- Cadillac Man (1990)
- Cadillac Ranch (1996)
- Cadillac Records (2008)
- Cado dalle nubi (2009)
- Caesar and Cleopatra (1945)
- Caesar the Conqueror (1962)
- Caesar Must Die (2012)
- Caesar and Otto's Deadly Xmas (2012)
- Caesar and Otto's Paranormal Halloween (2015)
- Caesar and Otto's Summer Camp Massacre (2009)
- Cafe Colette (1937)
- Cafe Funiculi Funicula (2018)
- Cafe Hostess (1940)
- Cafe Isobe (2008)
- Cafe Mascot (1936)
- Cafe Metropole (1937)
- Cafe Moscow (1936)
- Cafe Noir (2009)
- Cafe Society: (1939 & 1995)
- Cafe X (1992)
- Café de chinos (1949)
- Café Lumière (2003)
- Café Society (2016)
- Café. Waiting. Love (2014)
- Caffeine (2006)
- Cage (1989)
- The Cage: (1963 & 2017)
- Cage of Evil (1960)
- La Cage aux Folles (1978)
- La Cage aux Folles II (1980)
- Cage of Gold (1950)
- Cage Without a Key (1975) (TV)
- Caged: (1950, 2010, 2011 & 2020)
- The Caged Bird (1913)
- Caged Desires (1970)
- Caged Fury: (1948 & 1990)
- Caged Heat (1974)
- Caged No More (2016)
- Caged in Paradiso (1989)
- Cagefighter: Worlds Collide (2020)
- Cages (2005)
- Cagliostro: (1929 & 1975)
- Cahill U.S. Marshal (1973)
- Caiçara (1950)
- Caiga quien caiga (2018)
- Caillou's Holiday Movie (2003)
- Cain (1918)
- Caín (1984)
- Cain and Abel: (1982 & 2006)
- Cain and Mabel (1936)
- Cain's Cutthroats (1971)
- The Caine Mutiny (1954)
- Cairo: (1942 & 1963)
- Cairo Declaration (2015)
- Cairo Drive (2014)
- Cairo Exit (2010)
- Cairo Road (1950)
- Cairo Time (2009)
- Cake: (2005, 2014, 2018 & 2022)
- The Cake Eaters (2009)
- Cake: A Wedding Story (2007)
- Cakewalk (2019)

==== Cal ====
- Cal: (1984 & 2013)
- Cala, My Dog! (2003)
- Calais-Dover (1931)
- Calamity (1982)
- Calamity Anne series:
  - Calamity Anne's Inheritance (1913)
  - Calamity Anne's Vanity (1913)
  - Calamity Anne's Beauty (1913)
  - Calamity Anne, Heroine (1913)
  - Calamity Anne's Dream (1913)
  - Calamity Anne's Love Affair (1914)
- Calamity, a Childhood of Martha Jane Cannary (2020)
- Calamity Jane (1953)
- Calapor (2013)
- The Calcium Kid (2004)
- Calculated Risk (1963)
- Calcutta: (1947 & 1969)
- Calcutta 71 (1972)
- Calcutta News (2008)
- Calda e... infedele (1968)
- Caldera (2012)
- The Calendar: (1931 & 1948)
- Calendar Girl: (1947 & 1993)
- Calendar Girls: (2003 & 2015)
- Çalgi Çengi Ikimiz (2017)
- California Dreamin' (2007)
- California Dreaming (1979)
- California Firebrand (1948)
- California Split (1974)
- California Suite (1978)
- California Typewriter (2016)
- The Californians (2005)
- Caligula (1979)
- Caligula... The Untold Story (1982)
- The Call: (2013, 2020 American & 2020 South Korean)
- Call Girl: (1974, 2007 & 2012)
- Call Girl of Cthulhu (2014)
- Call for Love (2007)
- Call Me (1988)
- Call Me Bwana (1963)
- Call Me Crazy: A Five Film (2013 TV)
- Call Me Human (2020)
- Call Me King (2015)
- Call Me Kuchu (2012)
- Call Me Madam (1953)
- Call Me Mister (1951)
- Call Me Mother (2025)
- Call Me Tonight (1986)
- Call Me by Your Name (2017)
- Call Northside 777 (1948)
- The Call of Cthulhu (2005)
- Call of the Blood (1949)
- Call of the Forest: (1949 & 1965)
- The Call of the North: (1914, 1921 & 1929)
- Call of the Rockies: (1938 & 1944)
- The Call of the Wild: (1908, 1923, 1935, 1972, 1976 TV & 2020)
- Callas Forever (2002)
- Calle 54 (2000)
- The Caller: (1987, 2008 & 2011)
- Calling Dr. Death (1943)
- Calmi Couri Appassionati (2001)
- Calvary (2014)

==== Cam ====
- Cam (2018)
- Cama adentro (2004)
- Camarate (2001)
- Camarón: When Flamenco Became Legend (2005)
- Cambodia: Between War and Peace (1991)
- A Cambodian Spring (2017)
- The Cambric Mask (1919)
- Cambridge Spies (2003)
- The Camden 28 (2007)
- Came the Brawn (1938)
- Came a Hot Friday (1985)
- The Camel Boy (1984)
- Camel Safari (2013)
- Camel Spiders (2011)
- Camel Through the Eye of a Needle (1936)
- The Camel's Dance (1935)
- Cameleon (1997)
- Camelia (1954)
- Camelot (1967)
- The Camels (1988)
- The Camels Are Coming (1934)
- The Cameo (1913)
- Cameo Kirby: (1914, 1923 & 1930)
- The Cameo of the Yellowstone (1914)
- Camera: (2000 & 2014)
- Camera Buff (1979)
- Camera d'albergo (1981)
- Camera Obscura: (1921, 2000 & 2015)
- Camera Store (2017)
- Camera Thrills (1935)
- Cameraman: The Life and Work of Jack Cardiff (2010)
- The Cameraman (1928)
- The Cameraman's Revenge (1912)
- Cameraman Gangatho Rambabu (2012)
- Camere da letto (1997)
- Cameriera bella presenza offresi... (1951)
- Camerino Without a Folding Screen (1967)
- Cameron of the Royal Mounted (1921)
- Cameron's Closet (1988)
- Camila (1984)
- Camilla: (1954 & 1994)
- Camille: (1915, 1917, 1921, 1926 feature, 1926 short, 1936, 1984 & 2008)
- Camille 2000 (1969)
- Camille Claudel (1988)
- Camille Claudel 1915 (2013)
- Caminito alegre (1944)
- Caminito de Gloria (1939)
- Camino: (2008 & 2015)
- El Camino: A Breaking Bad Movie (2019)
- Camino a Marte (2017)
- Camouflage: (1944 & 1977)
- Camp: (1965 & 2003)
- The Camp (2013)
- Camp 14: Total Control Zone (2012)
- The Camp on Blood Island (1958)
- Camp Cucamonga (1990 TV)
- Camp Death III in 2D! (2019)
- Camp Fear (1991)
- The Camp Followers (1965)
- Camp Nowhere (1994)
- Camp Rock (2008)
- Camp Rock 2: The Final Jam (2010)
- Camp Rock 3 (2026)
- The Campaign (2012)
- Campfire (2004)
- Campfire Tales: (1991 & 1997)
- Camping Cosmos (1996)
- The Campus (2001)
- The Campus Flirt (1926)
- Campus Mystery (2015)
- The Campus Queen (2004)
- The Campus Vamp (1928)

==== Can ====
- Can of Worms (1999 TV)
- Can You Ever Forgive Me? (2018)
- Can You Keep a Secret? (2019)
- Can-Can (1960)
- Can't Buy Me Love (1987)
- Can't Hardly Wait (1998)
- Can't Stop the Music (1980)
- The Canadian (1926)
- Canadian Bacon (1995)
- The Canadian Conspiracy (1986)
- Canadian Pacific (1949)
- The Canadians (1961)
- The Canadiens, Forever (2009)
- A Canary Cage (1983)
- The Canary Effect (2006)
- The Canary Murder Case (1929)
- The Canary Yellow Bicycle (1999)
- Candida: (1961)
- The Candidate: (1959, 1964, 1972, 1980, 1998 & 2008)
- Candleshoe (1977)
- Candlestick (2014)
- Candy: (1968 & 2006)
- Candy Cane Lane (2023)
- Candy Mountain (1988)
- The Candy Tangerine Man (1975)
- Candyman: (1992 & 2021)
- Candyman: Day of the Dead (1999)
- Candyman: Farewell to the Flesh (1995)
- Cane River (1982)
- Cannery Row (1982)
- Cannibal: (2006, 2010 & 2013)
- Cannibal Apocalypse (1980)
- Cannibal Campout (1988)
- Cannibal Ferox (1981)
- Cannibal Girls (1973)
- Cannibal Holocaust (1980)
- Cannibal King (1915)
- The Cannibal Man (1972)
- Cannibal Rollerbabes (1997)
- Cannibal Terror (1981)
- Cannibal Tours (1988)
- Cannibal Women in the Avocado Jungle of Death (1989)
- Cannibal! The Musical (1996)
- Cannon for Cordoba (1970)
- Cannonball (1976)
- The Cannonball Run (1981)
- Cannonball Run II (1984)
- El Cantante (2007)
- Cantata (1963)
- A Canterbury Tale (1944)
- The Canterbury Tales (1972)
- The Canterville Ghost: (1944, 1985 TV, 1986 TV, 1996 TV & 2016)
- A Cantor's Tale (2005)
- The Canyons (2013)

==== Cap ====
- CAP 2 Intentos (2016)
- Cap Canaille (1983)
- Cap Tourmente (1993)
- Capacité 11 personnes (2004)
- The Cape Canaveral Monsters (1960)
- Cape Fear: (1962 & 1991)
- Cape of Good Hope (2004)
- Cape of the North (1976)
- Cape Nostalgia (2014)
- Cape Verde, My Love (2007)
- The Caper of the Golden Bulls (1967)
- Capernaum (2018)
- Capers (1937)
- Capital (2012)
- Capital I (2015)
- Capital Punishment (1925)
- Capitalism: A Love Story (2009)
- Capone: (1975 & 2020)
- Capone Cries a Lot (1985)
- Capote (2005)
- Cappy Ricks (1921)
- Cappy Ricks Returns (1935)
- Capriccio: (1938 & 1987)
- Caprice of the Mountains (1916)
- Caprices (1942)
- Caprichosa y millonaria (1940)
- Capricious Summer (1968)
- Capricorn One (1978)
- Captain: (1994, 1999, 2018 & 2019)
- The Captain: (1946, 1971, 2017 & 2019)
- Captain America: (1979 TV & 1990)
- Captain America: Brave New World (2025)
- Captain America: Civil War (2016)
- Captain America: The First Avenger (2011)
- Captain America: The Winter Soldier (2014)
- Captain America II: Death Too Soon (1979) (TV)
- Captain Apache (1971)
- Captain Applejack (1931)
- Captain Barbell (2003)
- Captain Blood: (1924, 1935 & 1960)
- Captain Boycott (1947)
- Captain Careless (1928)
- Captain Carey, U.S.A. (1949)
- Captain from Castile (1947)
- Captain Caution (1940)
- Captain China (1950)
- Captain Clegg (1962)
- Captain Conan (1996)
- Captain Corelli's Mandolin (2001)
- Captain Courtesy (1915)
- Captain Demonio (1950)
- Captain Eddie (1945)
- Captain EO (1986)
- Captain Falcon (1958)
- Captain Fantastic (2016)
- Captain Fury (1939)
- Captain of the Guard (1930)
- Captain Horatio Hornblower (1951)
- Captain Hurricane (1935)
- Captain Jack (1999)
- Captain Jinks of the Horse Marines (1916)
- Captain John Smith and Pocahontas (1953)
- Captain Khan (2018)
- Captain Khorshid (1987)
- Captain Kronos – Vampire Hunter (1974)
- Captain Kidd (1945)
- Captain Kidd and the Slave Girl (1954)
- Captain Kidd, Jr. (1919)
- Captain Kidd's Kids (1919)
- Captain Lash (1929)
- Captain Lightfoot (1955)
- Captain Magal (1993)
- Captain Marvel (2019)
- Captain Midnight, the Bush King (1911)
- Captain Mike Across America (2007)
- Captain Miller (2024)
- Captain Morten and the Spider Queen (2018)
- Captain Nagarjun (1986)
- Captain Nemo and the Underwater City (1969)
- Captain Newman, M.D. (1963)
- Captain Nova (2021)
- Captain Pantoja and the Special Services (1999)
- Captain Pirate (1952)
- Captain Phillips (2013)
- Captain Prabhakaran (1991)
- Captain Ron (1992)
- Captain Sabertooth and the Magic Diamond (2019)
- Captain Salvation (1927)
- Captain Scarlet vs. the Mysterons (1981) (TV)
- Captain Sindbad (1963)
- Captain Starlight, or Gentleman of the Road (1911)
- Captain Swagger (1928)
- Captain Thunderbolt (1953)
- Captain Underpants: The First Epic Movie (2017)
- Captain Video: Master of the Stratosphere (1951)
- Captain Volkonogov Escaped (2021)
- The Captain's Paradise (1953)
- Captains of the Clouds (1942)
- Captains Courageous (1937)
- Captivated: The Trials of Pamela Smart (2014)
- The Captive Heart (1946)
- Captive Hearts (1987)
- A Captive in the Land (1990)
- Captive State (2019)
- Captive Wild Woman (1943)
- Captive Women (1952)
- Captive's Island (1966)
- Captivity (2007)
- Capture the Flag (2015)
- Captured! (1933)
- Captured in Chinatown (1935)
- Capturing the Friedmans (2003)
- Capturing the Killer Nurse (2022)

==== Car ====
- The Car (1977)
- The Car (1997)
- Car 54, Where Are You? (1994)
- Car 99 (1935)
- Car Babes (2007)
- Car Crash (1981)
- Car Crazy (1965)
- Car Dogs (2017)
- Car of Dreams (1935)
- Car Trouble (1986)
- A Car-Tune Portrait (1937)
- Car, Violin and Blot the Dog (1974)
- Car Wash (1976)
- Cara y Cruz: Walang Sinasanto (1996)
- Carambola! (1974)
- Caramel (2007)
- Carandiru (2003)
- Caravaggio (1986)
- Caravaggio (2008) (TV)
- Caravaggio, il pittore maledetto (1941)
- Caravan (1934)
- Caravan (1946)
- Caravan (1971)
- Caravan (2025)
- Caravan of Courage: An Ewok Adventure (1984 TV)
- The Caravan Trail (1946)
- Caravan to Vaccarès (1974)
- Caravans (1978)
- Carbon Copy (1981)
- Carcasses (2009)
- The Card Counter (2021)
- The Card Player (2004)
- Cardboard Boxer (2016)
- Cardboard Cavalier (1949)
- Cardboard Gangsters (2017)
- Cardcaptor Sakura: The Movie (1999)
- Cardfight!! Vanguard: The Movie (2014)
- Cardiac Arrest (1980)
- Cardigan (1922)
- Cardillac (1969)
- The Cardinal (1936)
- The Cardinal (1963)
- Cardinal Richelieu (1935)
- Cardinal Wolsey (1912)
- Care Bears series:
  - The Care Bears Adventure in Wonderland (1987)
  - The Care Bears' Big Wish Movie (2005)
  - Care Bears: Journey to Joke-a-lot (2004)
  - The Care Bears Movie (1985)
  - Care Bears Movie II: A New Generation (1986)
  - Care Bears: Oopsy Does It! (2007)
  - Care Bears: Share Bear Shines (2010)
  - Care Bears: The Giving Festival (2010)
- The Career of a Chambermaid (1976)
- Career Girl (1944)
- Career Girls (1997)
- Career Opportunities (1991)
- Career Woman (1936)
- Careers (1929)
- Carefree (1938)
- Careful, He Might Heat You (1983)
- Careful, Soft Shoulders (1942)
- Careful What You Wish For (2015)
- Caregiver (2008)
- Careless (1962)
- The Careless Age (1929)
- Careless Lady (1932)
- Careless Love (2012)
- The Careless Years (1957)
- The Carer (2016)
- The Caretaker (1963)
- The Caretaker (2025)
- A Caretaker's Tale (2012)
- The Caretakers (1963)
- The Caretakers (2015)
- The Carey Treatment (1972)
- Carga de rurales (1896)
- Cargo (1990)
- Cargo (2006)
- Cargo (2009)
- Cargo (2013)
- Cargo (2017)
- Cargo (2018)
- Cargo (2019)
- Cargo 200 (2007)
- A Cargo to Africa (2009)
- A Caribbean Dream (2017)
- Caribbean Gold (1952)
- A Caribbean Mystery (1983) (TV)
- Carl's Date (2023)
- Carla (2003)
- Carla's Song (1996)
- Carlito's Way (1993)
- Carlito's Way: Rise to Power (2005)
- Carlos (2010 TV)
- Carlotta (2014) (TV)
- Carlton + Godard = Cinema (2003)
- Carma – The Movie (2022)
- Carmaux, défournage du coke (1896)
- Carmela (1942)
- Carmen: (1913, 1915 DeMille, 1915 Walsh, 1918, 1926, 1932, 1943, 1944, 1953, 1983, 1984, 2003 Russian, 2003 Spanish, 2021 & 2022)
- Carmen Comes Home (1951)
- Carmen Jones (1954)
- Carmen's Kiss (2011)
- Carmen & Lola (2018)
- Carmen Miranda: Bananas is My Business (1995)
- A Carmen of the North (1919)
- Carmen's Pure Love (1952)
- Carmencita (1894)
- Carmilla (2019)
- The Carmilla Movie (2017)
- Carmina or Blow Up (2012)
- Carnage (2002)
- Carnage (2011)
- Carnage (2017)
- Carnal Crimes (1991)
- Carnal Knowledge (1971)
- Carne (1968)
- Carne (1991)
- Carnegie Hall (1947)
- Carnera: The Walking Mountain (2008)
- Carnies (2010)
- Carnival of Blood (1970)
- Carnival Evening (1948)
- Carnival in Flanders (1935)
- Carnival of Love (1943)
- Carnival Night (1956)
- Carnival Queen (1937)
- Carnival Rock (1957)
- Carnival of Souls: (1962 & 1998)
- Carnival Story (1954)
- Carnival Sunday (1945)
- Carnival in the Tropics (1942)
- Carnivale (1999)
- Carnosaur series:
  - Carnosaur (1993)
  - Carnosaur 2 (1995)
  - Carnosaur 3: Primal Species (1996)
- Carny (1980)
- Carny (2009)
- Caro diario (1993)
- Carol (2015)
- Carol for Another Christmas (1964) (TV)
- Carol of the Bells (2022)
- A Carol Christmas (2003) (TV)
- Carol's Journey (2002)
- Carola de día, Carola de noche (1969)
- Carola Lamberti – Eine vom Zirkus (1954)
- Carolina (1934)
- Carolina (2003)
- Carolina Blues (1944)
- Carolina Caroline (2026)
- Carolina Moon (1940)
- Carolina Moon (2007)
- Caroline and Jackie (2013)
- Caroline at Midnight (1993)
- Carolyn of the Corners (1919)
- Carousel (1956)
- The Carpetbaggers (1964)
- The Carpenter's Son (2025)
- Carpool (1983)
- Carpool (1996)
- Carpoolers (2021)
- Carrément à l'Ouest (2001)
- Carrera de bicicletas en el velódromo de Arroyo Seco (1898)
- Carrie (1952)
- Carrie (1976)
- Carrie (2002) (TV)
- Carrie (2003)
- Carrie Pilby (2016)
- Carried Away (1996)
- Carried Away (2009)
- Carriers (2009)
- Carrington (1995)
- Carry Me Back (1982)
- Carry On (1927)
- Carry On Admiral (1957)
- Carry On Deshpande (2015)
- Carry On Jatta (2012)
- Carry On Jatta 2 (2018)
- Carry On Jatta (2023)
- Carry On Kesar (2017)
- Carry On Maratha (2015)
- Carry On Pickpocket (1982)
- Carry On series:
  - Carry On Abroad (1972)
  - Carry On Again Doctor (1969)
  - Carry On Behind (1975)
  - Carry On Cabby (1963)
  - Carry On Camping (1969)
  - Carry On Cleo (1964)
  - Carry On Columbus (1992)
  - Carry On Constable (1960)
  - Carry On Cowboy (1965)
  - Carry On Cruising (1962)
  - Carry On Dick (1974)
  - Carry On Doctor (1967)
  - Carry On Emmannuelle (1978)
  - Carry On England (1976)
  - Carry On Girls (1973)
  - Carry On Henry (1971)
  - Carry On Jack (1964)
  - Carry On Loving (1970)
  - Carry On Matron (1972)
  - Carry On Nurse (1959)
  - Carry On Regardless (1961)
  - Carry On Screaming! (1966)
  - Carry On Sergeant (1958)
  - Carry On Spying (1964)
  - Carry On Teacher (1959)
  - Carry On Up the Jungle (1970)
  - Carry On Up the Khyber (1968)
  - Carry On at Your Convenience (1971)
  - Don't Lose Your Head (1967)
  - Follow That Camel (1967)
  - That's Carry On! (1977)
- Carry on, Sergeant! (1928)
- Cars series:
  - Cars (2006)
  - Cars 2 (2011)
  - Cars 3 (2017)
- Cars of the Revolution (2008)
- The Cars That Ate Paris (1974)
- Carson City (1952)
- Cart (2014)
- Carta Alas: Huwag Ka Nang Humirit (2001)
- Cartagena (2009)
- Cartel Land (2015)
- Cartels (2017)
- Carter (2022)
- Carter's Army (1970) (TV)
- A Cartoonist's Nightmare (1935)
- Cartoonists - Foot Soldiers of Democracy (2014)
- Cartouche (1962)
- Cartouche, King of Paris (1950)
- Carts (2007)
- Carts of Darkness (2008)
- Caruso Pascoski, Son of a Pole (1988)
- Caruso, Zero for Conduct (2001)
- Carve Her Name with Pride (1958)
- Carved: The Slit-Mouthed Woman (2007)
- Carver (2008)
- Carville: Winning Is Everything, Stupid! (2024)
- Carving a Life (2017)
- Caryl of the Mountains (1936)

==== Cas ====
- Casa d'appuntamento (1972)
- Casa de los Babys (2003)
- Casa de Mi Padre (2012)
- La casa stregata (1982)
- La Casa del Terror (1959)
- Casablanca (1942)
- Casablanca Beats (2021)
- Casanova: (1918, 1927, 1934, 1976, 1987 TV & 2005)
- Casanova's Big Night (1954)
- Casanovva (2012)
- Casbah (1948)
- Cascabel (2000)
- The Case (2007)
- Case 39 (2009)
- The Case of the Bloody Iris (1972)
- The Case of Charles Peace (1949)
- The Case for Christ (2017)
- Case Closed (1988) (TV)
- The Case of Hana & Alice (2015)
- The Case of the Mukkinese Battle-Horn (1956)
- Case for a Rookie Hangman (1970)
- The Case of the Scorpion's Tail (1971)
- Case Study: LSD (1969)
- A Case of You (2013)
- Casey Jones (2011)
- Casey's Birthday (1914)
- Cash: (1933, 2007, 2008 & 2010)
- Cash and Carry (1937)
- Cash and Curry (2008)
- Cash on Demand (1961)
- Cash McCall (1960)
- Cash Only (2015)
- Cash Out (unreleased)
- Cashback (2006)
- Casi casi (2006)
- Casi muerta (2023)
- Casino (1995)
- Casino Jack (2010)
- Casino Jack and the United States of Money (2010)
- Casino Royale: (1967 & 2006)
- Casper the Friendly Ghost series:
  - Casper (1995)
  - Casper Meets Wendy (1998)
  - Casper: A Spirited Beginning (1997)
  - Casper's Haunted Christmas (2000)
  - Casper's Scare School (2006)
- Casque d'or (1952)
- Cassadaga (2011)
- The Cassandra Cat (1963)
- The Cassandra Crossing (1976)
- Cassandra's Dream (2007)
- Casshern (2004)
- Cast Away (2000)
- Cast a Dark Shadow (1955)
- Cast a Deadly Spell (1991) (TV)
- Cast a Giant Shadow (1966)
- Cast a Long Shadow (1959)
- Castaway (1986)
- The Castaway Cowboy (1974)
- El castillo de los monstruos (1958)
- The Castle: (1968, 1994, 1997 Australian & 1997 Austrian)
- Castle of Evil (1966)
- Castle Falls (2021)
- Castle Freak: (1995 & 2020)
- The Castle of Fu Manchu (1969)
- Castle Keep (1969)
- Castle of the Living Dead (1964)
- Castle in the Sky (1986)
- Castro Street (1966)
- Casualties of War (1989)

==== Cat ====
- The Cat: (1947, 1956, 1958, 1966, 1977, 1988, 1992 & 2011)
- Cat Ballou (1965)
- A Cat in the Brain (1990)
- The Cat and the Canary: (1927, 1939, 1961 TV & 1978)
- Cat City (1986)
- Cat Concerto (1947)
- The Cat in the Hat: (2003 & 2026)
- Cat on a Hot Tin Roof (1958)
- The Cat and the Moon (2019)
- The Cat o' Nine Tails (1971)
- The Cat from Outer Space (1978)
- Cat People: (1942 & 1982)
- The Cat Returns (2002)
- The Cat Shows Her Claws (1960)
- Cat-Tails for Two (1953)
- Cat's Eye: (1985 & 1997)
- The Cat's Meow (2002)
- Catacombs: (1965 & 2007)
- Catch .44 (2012)
- Catch a Fire (2006)
- Catch the Heat (1987)
- Catch Me If You Can (2002)
- Catch and Release: (2006 & 2018)
- Catch That Kid (2004)
- Catch-22 (1970)
- The Catcher (1998)
- The Catcher Was a Spy (2018)
- Catchfire (1990)
- Category 6: Day of Destruction (2004) (TV)
- Category 7: The End of the World (2005) (TV)
- The Catered Affair (1956)
- Caterina in the Big City (2005)
- Catfish (2010)
- Catherine Called Birdy (2022)
- Catherine the Great: (1920 & 1995 TV)
- Cathy's Curse (1977)
- Cats: (1925, 1998 & 2019)
- The Cats: (1965 & 1968)
- Cats & Dogs (2001)
- Cats & Dogs: The Revenge of Kitty Galore (2010)
- Cats Don't Dance (1997)
- Catscratch (2005)
- Catwoman (2004)
- Catwoman: Hunted (2022)

==== Cau ====
- Caucasia (2007)
- Caudillo (1974)
- Caught: (1931, 1949, 1996 & 2015 TV)
- Caught in the Act: (1931 & 1941)
- Caught in Berlin's Underworld (1927)
- Caught Bluffing (1922)
- Caught in a Cabaret (1914)
- Caught Cheating (1931)
- Caught in the Crossfire (2010)
- Caught in the Draft (1941)
- Caught in a Flue (1914)
- Caught in the Fog (1928)
- Caught Inside (2010)
- Caught in the Net: (1928 & 2020)
- Caught Out: Crime. Corruption. Cricket (2023)
- Caught Plastered (1931)
- Caught in the Rain (1914)
- Caught Short (1930)
- Caught Stealing (2025)
- Caught by the Tides (2024)
- Caught in Time (2020)
- Caught in Trap (2014)
- Caught Up (1998)
- Caught by a Wave (2021)
- Caught in the Web (2012)
- Cauldron of Blood (1970)
- Causa e Efeito (2014)
- Cause for Alarm! (1951)
- Cause of Death: Unknown (2023)
- Cause for Divorce: (1923 & 1937)
- Cause of Divorce (1972)
- Causeway (2022)

==== Cav–Caz ====
- Cavalcade: (1933 & 1960)
- Cavalcade of Heroes (1950)
- Cavalcade of Song (1953)
- Cavalcade of the West (1936)
- Cavalier in Devil's Castle (1959)
- Cavalier of the West (1931)
- Cavaliers of the Crown (1930)
- Cavaliers of the Kurfürstendamm (1932)
- Cavalleria rusticana (1982 TV)
- Cavalry: (1936 American & 1936 Italian)
- Cavalry Charge (1964)
- Cavalry Command (1958)
- The Cave: (2005, 2019 Syrian & 2019 Thai)
- Cave of Forgotten Dreams (2010)
- Cave Girls (1984)
- Cave-In! (1983 TV)
- Cave of the Living Dead (1964)
- Cave of Outlaws (1951)
- The Cave of the Silken Web: (1927 & 1967)
- The Cave of the Yellow Dog (2005)
- Caveat (2020)
- Caved In: Prehistoric Terror (2006) (TV)
- Cavedigger (2013)
- Cavedweller (2004)
- Caveman (1981)
- The Caveman's Valentine (2002)
- Cavemen (2013)
- Cayenne (2020)
- Cayo (2005)
- Cazuza – Time Don't Stop (2004)

=== Cb ===
- CB4 (1993)

=== Ce ===
==== Cea–Cel ====
- Cease Fire: (1953, 1985 & 2006)
- Cease Firing (1934)
- Ceasefire (2025)
- Cecil B. Demented (2000)
- Cecile Is Dead (1944)
- Cecelia (1954)
- Cecilia (1982)
- Cecilia of the Pink Roses (1918)
- Cecilie (2007)
- Cedar Boys (2009)
- Cedar Rapids (2011)
- Ceddo (1977)
- Ceiling Zero (1936)
- Cela s'appelle l'aurore (1956)
- The Celebration (1998)
- Celebration at Big Sur (1969)
- Celebration Day (2012)
- Celebration Family (1987) (TV)
- Celebrity: (1928 & 1998)
- Celebrity Marriage (2017)
- Celeste (2018)
- Celeste in the City (2004) (TV)
- Celeste and Jesse Forever (2012)
- Celestial Clockwork (1995)
- Celestial Wives of the Meadow Mari (2012)
- Celia: (1949 & 1989)
- Celia's Lives (2006)
- Celine and Julie Go Boating (1974)
- Celine: Through the Eyes of the World (2010)
- Cell (2016)
- The Cell (2000)
- The Cell 2 (2009)
- Cell 211 (2009)
- Cell 213 (2011)
- Cell Phone (2003)
- The Cellar (1989)
- Cello (2005)
- Cellular (2004)
- Celluloid Man (2012)
- Celsius 41.11 (2004)
- Celtic Pride (1996)

==== Cem–Cey ====
- Cemara's Family (2019)
- The Cement Garden (1993)
- The Cemetery Club: (1993 & 2006)
- Cemetery Gates (2006)
- Cemetery Junction (2010)
- Cemetery Man (1994)
- Cemetery of Terror (1985)
- Cemetery Without Crosses (1969)
- Censor: (2001 & 2021)
- Center Stage: (1991 & 2000)
- Center Stage: Turn It Up (2008)
- Center Stage: On Pointe (2016)
- The Center of the World (2001)
- Centigrade: (2007 & 2020)
- Central Intelligence (2016)
- Central Park: (1932 & 2017)
- The Central Park Five (2012)
- Central Station (1998)
- Centurion (2010)
- Century Hotel (2001)
- Cerberus (2005) (TV)
- Le Cercle rouge (1970)
- Ceremony (2010)
- Ceremony of Disbanding (1967)
- Certain Fury (1985)
- A Certain Magical Index: The Movie – The Miracle of Endymion (2013)
- Certain Women (2016)
- Certainty (2011)
- Certifiably Jonathan (2007)
- Certified Copy (2010)
- Cesante (2003)
- César (1936)
- Cesar Chavez (2014)
- César and Rosalie (1972)
- Cesar's Last Fast (2014)
- Cet homme est dangereux (1953)
- Ceto, the Foolish Millionaire (1953)
- Ceux de la colline (2009)
- Ceylon (2013)

=== Ch ===
==== Cha ====
- Cha Cha (1979)
- Cha cha cha (2013)
- Cha Cha for Twins (2012)
- Cha Cha Real Smooth (2022)
- Chaahat (1996)
- Chaahat – Ek Nasha (2005)
- Chaakapesh (2019)
- Chaakara (1980)
- Chaal Jeevi Laiye! (2019)
- ChaalBaaz (1989)
- Chad Vader: Day Shift Manager (2006)
- Chahat (1971)
- Chai Lai (2006)
- Chain of Fools (2000)
- Chain Letter (2010)
- Chain Lightning: (1922, 1927 & 1950)
- Chain Reaction: (1996 & 2017)
- The Chain Reaction (1980)
- Chained: (1934, 2012, 2019 & 2020)
- Chained Heat (1983)
- Chained for Life: (1952 & 2019)
- Chairman of the Board (1998)
- Chak De India (2007)
- Chakushin Ari (2003)
- Chalet Girl (2011)
- Chalk (2007)
- The Chalk Garden (1964)
- Challenge: (1984 & 2009)
- The Challenge: (1916, 1938, 1948, 1958, 1960, 1970, 1982, 2003, 2011 & 2022)
- Challenge 2 (2012)
- A Challenge for Robin Hood (1967)
- The Challenge... A Tribute to Modern Art (1974)
- Challenger (1990) (TV)
- The Challenger (2015)
- The Challenger Disaster (2013) (TV)
- Challengers (2024)
- The Challengers (1990) (TV)
- Challenges (2011)
- Chalte Chalte: (1976 & 2003)
- The Chamber: (1996 & 2016)
- Chamber of Horrors: (1929 & 1966)
- Chameleon Street (1989)
- Chameli (2004)
- The Champ: (1931 & 1979)
- Champagne: (1928 & 2014)
- Chaperone (2024)
- Champagne for Caesar (1950)
- The Champagne Murders (1967)
- Champion: (1949, 2000, 2002, 2003, 2018 & 2019)
- The Champion: (1915, 1943, 1973 & 2020)
- Champion of the World (2021)
- The Champion of the World (1927)
- Champions: (1984, 1997, 2018 & 2023)
- Chan Is Missing (1982)
- Chance: (1984, 2002 & 2020)
- Chance at Heaven (1933)
- Chance Meeting: (1954 & 1959)
- The Chancellor Manuscript (2008)
- Chances Are (1989)
- Chandni Bar (2001)
- Chandni Chowk to China (2009)
- Chandramukhi (2005)
- Chandramukhi (2022)
- Chandramukhi 2 (2023)
- Chandrika (1950)
- Chang (1927)
- Chang Chen Ghost Stories: (2015 & 2016)
- Change of Habit (1969)
- The Change-Up (2011)
- The Changeling (1980)
- Changeling (2008)
- Changes (1969)
- Changing Lanes (2002)
- The Channel (2023)
- The Chant of Jimmie Blacksmith (1978)
- Chaos: (2000, 2001 & 2005 Capitol, 2005 Dominion & 2008)
- Le Chaos (2007)
- Chaos Theory (2008)
- Chaos Walking (2021)
- Chaplin (1992)
- The Chaplin Revue (1959)
- Chappaqua (1966)
- Chappaquiddick (2018)
- Chapter 27 (2007)
- Character (1997)
- Charade (1963)
- La Charcuterie mécanique (1895)
- The Charge of the Light Brigade: (1936 & 1968)
- Chariots of Fire (1981)
- Charlatan (2020)
- The Charlatan: (1917 & 1929)
- The Charles Bukowski Tapes (1985)
- Charley Varrick (1973)
- Charlie Bartlett (2008)
- Charlie Chan in Egypt (1935)
- Charlie Chan in London (1934)
- Charlie Chan at Monte Carlo (1937)
- Charlie Chan at the Opera (1937)
- Charlie Chan in Shanghai (1935)
- Charlie Chan's Courage (1934)
- Charlie Countryman (2013)
- Charlie and the Chocolate Factory (2005)
- Charlie Harper (2026)
- Charlie Muffin (1979)
- Charlie St. Cloud (2010)
- Charlie the Unicorn (2005)
- Charlie Wilson's War (2007)
- Charlie's Angels series:
  - Charlie's Angels (2000)
  - Charlie's Angels: Full Throttle (2003)
  - Charlie's Angels (2019)
- Charlie, the Lonesome Cougar (1967)
- Charlotte: (1974, 1981 & 2021)
- Charlotte et son Jules (1960)
- Charlotte Gray (2001)
- Charlotte Sometimes (2002)
- Charlotte's Web: (1973 & 2006)
- Charlotte's Web 2: Wilbur's Great Adventure (2003)
- Charly (1968)
- Charm City Kings (2020)
- Charro! (1969)
- The Chase: (1946, 1966, 1971, 1991 TV, 1994 & 2017)
- The Chaser: (1938 & 2008)
- Chasers (1994)
- Chasing 3000 (2006)
- Chasing Amy (1997)
- Chasing the Deer (1994)
- Chasing the Dragon (2017)
- Chasing the Dragon II: Wild Wild Bunch (2019)
- Chasing Fortune (1930)
- Chasing Liberty (2004)
- Chasing Madoff (2010)
- Chasing Mavericks (2012)
- Chasing Papi (2003)
- Chasing Sleep (2000)
- Chaste Susanne: (1926 & 1937)
- Chasuke's Journey (2015)
- Le Chat (1971)
- Château de la Reine (2015)
- Chato's Land (1972)
- Chattahoochee (1989)
- Chattanooga Choo Choo (1984)

==== Che ====
- Che: Part One (2009)
- Che: Part Two (2009)
- Cheap Thrills (2013)
- Cheaper by the Dozen: (2003 & 2022)
- Cheaper by the Dozen 2 (2005)
- The Cheat: (1912, 1915, 1923, 1931 & 1937)
- Cheaters: (1934 & 2000 TV)
- The Cheaters: (1930 & 1945)
- Cheats (2002)
- Chechi (1950)
- Check (2021)
- Check and Double Check (1930)
- Check the Store Next Door (2016)
- Checkered Flag (1990) (TV)
- The Checkered Flag: (1926 & 1963)
- Checkered Flag or Crash (1977)
- Cheech & Chong's The Corsican Brothers (1984)
- Cheech & Chong's Next Movie (1980)
- Cheeni Kum (2007)
- Cheerleader Queens (2003)
- Cheetah (1989)
- The Cheetah Girls series:
  - The Cheetah Girls (2003)
  - The Cheetah Girls 2 (2006)
  - The Cheetah Girls 3 (2008)
- Chef: (2014 & 2017)
- Chelsea Girls (1966)
- Chelsea on the Rocks (2008)
- Chemical Hearts (2020)
- Chen Mo and Meiting (2002)
- Chennai Express (2013)
- Cheri (2009)
- Cherish in Love (2014)
- Chernobyl: The Final Warning (1991) (TV)
- Chernobyl Diaries (2012)
- Cherry: (2010 & 2021)
- Cherry 2000 (1987)
- Cherry Blossom Memories (2015)
- Cherry Blossoms (2009)
- Cherry Bomb (2011)
- Cherry Falls (2000)
- The Cherry Orchard (1981 TV & 1999)
- Cherry Returns (2016)
- Cherry Tree (2015)
- Chess of the Wind (1976)
- The Chess Players (1977)
- Chesty Anderson, USN (1976)
- Chevolution (2008)
- Cheyenne Autumn (1964)
- Cheyenne Autumn Trail (1964)
- The Cheyenne Social Club (1970)

==== Chi ====
- Chi-hwa-seon (2002)
- Chi-Raq (2015)
- A Chiara (2021)
- Chica de Río (2001)
- Chicago: (1927 & 2002)
- Chicago 10 (2007)
- Chicago Cab (1997)
- Chicago Calling (1951)
- Chicago Confidential (1957)
- Chicago Massacre: Richard Speck (2007)
- Chicken: (2001 & 2015)
- Chicken a La King (1928)
- Chicken Little: (1943 & 2005)
- Chicken Run (2000)
- Chicken Run: Dawn of the Nugget (2023)
- Chicken with Plums (2011)
- Chickens: (1916 & 1921)
- Chibi Maruko-chan: Italia Kara Kita Shōnen (2015)
- Chihayafuru: Kami no Ku (2016)
- Chiikawa the Movie: The Secret of Mermaid Island (2026)
- Chilbeontong sosageon (1936)
- Child of Divorce (1946)
- A Child Is Waiting (1965)
- Child 44 (2015)
- Child's Play: (1954, 1972 & 1992)
- Child's Play series:
  - Child's Play: (1988 & 2019)
  - Child's Play 2 (1990)
  - Child's Play 3 (1991)
  - Bride of Chucky (1998)
  - Seed of Chucky (2004)
  - Curse of Chucky (2013)
  - Cult of Chucky (2017)
- Child's Pose (2013)
- Childhood Days (1990)
- Children: (2006 & 2011)
- The Children: (1980, 1990 & 2008)
- The Children Act (2017)
- The Children Are Watching Us (1944)
- Children of Blood and Bone (2027)
- Children of the Corn series:
  - Children of the Corn: (1984 & 2009 TV)
  - Children of the Corn II: The Final Sacrifice (1993)
  - Children of the Corn III: Urban Harvest (1995)
  - Children of the Corn IV: The Gathering (1996)
  - Children of the Corn V: Fields of Terror (1998)
  - Children of the Corn 666: Isaac's Return (1999)
  - Children of the Corn: Revelation (2001)
  - Children of the Corn: Genesis (2011)
- Children of the Damned (1964)
- Children of the Dark (1994) (TV)
- Children of Divorce: (1927 & 1939)
- Children of Heaven (1997)
- Children of Hiroshima (1952)
- The Children of Huang Shi (2008)
- Children of a Lesser God (1986)
- Children of the Living Dead (2001)
- Children of Love (1953)
- Children of Men (2006)
- Children of the Night: (1985 & 1991)
- Children of Paradise (1945)
- Children of the Revolution: (1923, 1996 & 2010)
- Children of the Sea (2019)
- Children Shouldn't Play with Dead Things (1972)
- Children of the Stork (1999)
- Children of the Street (1929)
- Children of the Streets (1914)
- Children of Troubled Times (1935)
- Children Who Chase Lost Voices (2011)
- The Children's Hour (1961)
- A Children's Story (2004)
- Childstar (2004)
- Chill Factor (1999)
- Chilly Scenes of Winter (1979)
- Chimera Strain (2018)
- The Chimes (1914)
- Chimes at Midnight (1965)
- Chimmie Fadden (1915)
- Chimmie Fadden Out West (1915)
- The Chimney Sweep (1906)
- The Chimp: (1932 & 2001)
- Chimpanzee (2012)
- China (1943)
- China 9, Liberty 37 (1978)
- China Clipper (1936)
- China Gate: (1957 & 1998)
- China Moon (1994)
- China Seas (1935)
- China Sky (1945)
- The China Syndrome (1979)
- Chinaman (2005)
- Chinatown (1974)
- Chinese Box (1997)
- Chinese Coffee (2000)
- Chinese Doctors (2021)
- A Chinese Ghost Story: (1987 & 2011)
- A Chinese Ghost Story II (1990)
- A Chinese Ghost Story III (1991)
- A Chinese Odyssey (1995)
- Chinese Odyssey 2002 (2002)
- A Chinese Odyssey Part Three (2016)
- Chinese Opium Den (1894)
- The Chinese Parrot (1927)
- Chinese Puzzle (2013)
- The Chinese Puzzle: (1919 & 1932)
- Chino: (1973 & 1991)
- La Chinoise (1968)
- Chinthavishtayaya Shyamala (1998)
- Chip 'n Dale: Rescue Rangers (2022)
- The Chipmunk Adventure (1987)
- Chiriyakhana (1967)
- Chiriyo Chiri (1982)
- Chirusoku no Natsu (2003)
- Chisum (1970)
- Chitty Chitty Bang Bang (1968)

==== Chl–Cho ====
- Chloé (1996)
- Chloe (2010)
- Chloe, Love Is Calling You (1934)
- Chloe and Theo (2015)
- Chlorine: (2013 & 2015)
- Chocolat: (1988, 2000 & 2016)
- Chocolate: (2005, 2007 & 2008)
- Chocolate City (2015)
- Chocolate City: Vegas Strip (2017)
- Chocolate Eclair (1979)
- Chocolate and Soldiers (1938)
- The Chocolate War (1988)
- The Choice: (1970 & 2016)
- The Choice 2020 (2020) (TV)
- Choices (2021)
- Choices of the Heart (1980) (TV)
- The Choirboys (1977)
- Choke: (2008 & 2011)
- Choke Canyon (1986)
- Choked (2020)
- Choker (2005)
- Chokeslam (2016)
- Chokher Aloy (1989)
- Chokher Bali (2003)
- Choking Hazard (2004)
- Choking Man (2006)
- Chokka Thangam (2003)
- Cholo Potol Tuli (2020)
- Chongqing Hot Pot (2016)
- Choo Mandhirakaali (2021)
- Choodalani Vundi (1998)
- Choodatha Pookal (1985)
- Choola (1979)
- Choondakkari (1977)
- Choori Chikkanna (1969)
- Choorian: (1963 & 1998)
- Choose (2011)
- Choose or Die (2022)
- Choose Me (1984)
- Chopper (2000)
- Chopper Chicks in Zombietown (1989)
- Chopping Mall (1986)
- Choreography for Copy Machine (1991)
- Chori Chori Chupke Chupke (2001)
- The Chorus (2004)
- A Chorus Line (1985)
- Chota Mumbai (2007)

==== Chr–Chu ====
- Christ Stopped at Eboli (1979)
- Christiane F. (1981)
- Christine: (1958, 1983 & 2016)
- Christine, Princess of Eroticism (1978)
- Christmas, Again (2014)
- Christmas in August (1998)
- Christmas Bounty (2013)
- Christmas Is Cancelled (2021)
- The Christmas Candle (2013)
- The Christmas Card (2006) (TV)
- A Christmas Carol: (1908, 1910, 1938, 1951, 1971, 1984 TV, 1997, 1999 TV, 2004 TV, 2006, 2009, 2019 TV & 2022)
- Christmas Carol: The Movie (2001)
- Christmas Child (2003)
- The Christmas Chronicles (2018)
- The Christmas Chronicles 2 (2020)
- Christmas in Connecticut (1945)
- Christmas Cottage (2008)
- Christmas Cruelty! (2013)
- The Christmas Dream (1900)
- Christmas Eve: (1947 & 2015)
- Christmas Evil (1980)
- Christmas Holiday (1944)
- Christmas in July (1940)
- Christmas with the Kranks (2004)
- Christmas Lilies of the Field (1979) (TV)
- Christmas on Mars (2008)
- Christmas Memories (1915)
- A Christmas Prince (2017)
- A Christmas Prince: The Royal Baby (2019)
- A Christmas Prince: The Royal Wedding (2018)
- The Christmas Shoes (2002) (TV)
- A Christmas Story (1983)
- A Christmas Story 2 (2012)
- A Christmas Story Christmas (2022)
- A Christmas Tale (2008)
- Christmas in Tattertown (1988) (TV)
- The Christmas That Almost Wasn't (1966)
- The Christmas Toy (1986) (TV)
- The Christmas Tree: (1966, 1969 & 1996 TV)
- Christmess (2023)
- Christopher Robin (2018)
- Christopher Strong (1933)
- The Christophers (2026)
- Chronicle (2012)
- Chronicle of a Blood Merchant (2015)
- Chronicle of a Disappearance (1996)
- Chronicles of the Ghostly Tribe (2015)
- The Chronicles of Melanie (2016)
- The Chronicles of Narnia series:
  - The Chronicles of Narnia: The Lion, the Witch and the Wardrobe (2005)
  - The Chronicles of Narnia: Prince Caspian (2008)
  - The Chronicles of Narnia: The Voyage of the Dawn Treader (2010)
- The Chronicles of Riddick (2004)
- Chuck (2016)
- Chuck & Buck (2000)
- Chuck Amuck: The Movie (1991)
- Chulas Fronteras (1976)
- Chum (2026)
- Chump Change (2004)
- A Chump at Oxford (1940)
- The Chumscrubber (2005)
- Chungking Express (1994)
- Chunhyang (2000)
- Chup Chup Ke (2006)
- The Church (1989)
- Church Ball (2006)
- Churchill: The Hollywood Years (2004)
- Chushingura (1963)
- Chutney Popcorn (1999)

=== Ci ===
==== Cia–Cin ====
- Ciao (2008)
- Ciao Alberto (2021)
- Ciao America (2002)
- Ciao Bella (2007)
- Ciao Brother (2016)
- Ciao Ciao (2025)
- Ciao, ciao bambina! (1959)
- Ciao! Manhattan (1972)
- Ciao marziano (1980)
- Ciao, Professore! (1992)
- Ciao UFO (2019)
- Ciboulette (1933)
- Cicada (2020)
- Cicada (2024)
- Cicadas (2025)
- Cicak Man series:
  - Cicak Man (2006)
  - Cicak Man 2: Planet Hitam (2008)
  - Cicak Man 3 (2015)
- Ciccio Forgives, I Don't (1968)
- El Cid (1961)
- The Cider House Rules (1999)
- Cider with Rosie (1998)
- Cielito Lindo (2010)
- Cielo (2017)
- La ciénaga (2001)
- Cigano (2013)
- Cigarette Girl (1947)
- Cigarette Girl (2009)
- The Cigarette Girl (1917)
- The Cigarette Girl from Mosselprom (1924)
- Cigarette Ki Tarah (2012)
- Cigarettes & Coffee (1993)
- Cigarettes, Whiskey and Wild Women (1959)
- Ciguli Miguli (1952)
- Cimarron (1931)
- Cimarron (1960)
- The Cincinnati Kid (1965)
- Cinco (2010)
- Cinco besos (1946)
- Cinco fueron escogidos (1943)
- Cinco gallinas y el cielo (1957)
- Cinderella: (1899, 1914, 1916, 1937, 1947, 1955, 1957 TV, 1960, 1965 TV, 1977, 1979, 1997 TV, 2000 TV, 2002, 2006, 2012, 2015 Disney, 2015 Indian, 2021 American & 2021 Indian)
- Cinderella series:
  - Cinderella (1950)
  - Cinderella II: Dreams Come True (2002)
  - Cinderella III: A Twist in Time (2007)
- Cinderella '80 (1984)
- Cinderella Blues (1931)
- Cinderella the Cat (2017)
- Cinderella or the Glass Slipper (1913)
- Cinderella of the Hills (1921)
- Cinderella Jones (1946)
- Cinderella Liberty (1973)
- Cinderella Man (2005)
- The Cinderella Man (1917)
- Cinderella Meets Fella (1938)
- Cinderella and the Secret Prince (2018)
- A Cinderella Story series:
  - A Cinderella Story (2004)
  - Another Cinderella Story (2008)
  - A Cinderella Story: Once Upon a Song (2011)
  - A Cinderella Story: If the Shoe Fits (2016)
  - A Cinderella Story: Christmas Wish (2019)
  - A Cinderella Story: Starstruck (2021)
- Cinderella Swings It (1943)
- Cinderella's Twin (1920)
- Cinderfella (1960)
- Cinders (1913)
- Cinders (1920)
- Cinders (1926)
- Cindrella (2016)
- Cindy (1978) (TV)
- Cindy la Regia (2020)
- Cindy: The Doll Is Mine (2005)
- Cindy's Love Games (1979)
- Cine Gibi: O Filme (2004)
- Cine Gibi 2 (2005)
- Cine Holliúdy (2012)
- Cinema, Aspirins and Vultures (2005)
- Cinema Bandi (2021)
- Cinema Choopistha Mava (2015)
- Cinema Cinema (1979)
- Cinema Company (2012)
- Cinema Days (2007)
- A Cinema Girl's Romance (1915)
- Cinema Is Everywhere (2011)
- The Cinema Murder (1919)
- Cinema Paithiyam (1975)
- Cinema Paradiso (1988)
- Cinema in Sudan: Conversations with Gadalla Gubara (2008)
- The Cinema Travellers (2016)
- Cinema of Unease: A Personal Journey by Sam Neill (1995)
- Cinema Veeran (2017)
- Cinema Verite (2011)
- Cinemania (2002)
- Cinemanovels (2013)
- Cinerama Adventure (2002)
- Cinerama Holiday (1955)
- Cinnamon (2011)
- Cinnamon (2023)
- Cinnamon Flower (1943)
- Cinnamon Skin (1953)
- Cinta (1975)
- Cinta Beruang (2012)
- Cinta Kura Kura (2012)
- Cinta Metropolitan (1996)
- Cinta Pertama (1973)
- Cinta Pertama (2006)
- Cinta dalam Sepotong Roti (1991)

==== Cir–Civ ====
- The Circle: (1925, 2000, 2014, 2015 & 2017)
- Circle of Friends: (1995 & 2006 TV)
- Circle of Iron (1978)
- Circuit no Ōkami (1977)
- The Circus: (1928 & 1943)
- Circus: (1936 & 2000)
- Circus World (1964)
- Cirque du Freak: The Vampire's Assistant (2009)
- Cirque du Soleil: Worlds Away (2012)
- Cita en la frontera (1940)
- Cita en las estrellas (1949)
- Citadel (2012)
- The Citadel: (1938 & 1960)
- Citadel of Crime (1941)
- Citation (2020)
- Cities of Last Things (2018)
- Cities in Love (2015)
- Cities and Years (1930)
- Citizen (2001)
- Citizen Ashe (2021)
- Citizen Autistic (2013)
- Citizen Cohn (1992)
- Citizen Duane (2006)
- Citizen Dog (2004)
- Citizen Gangster (2011)
- Citizen I (1977)
- Citizen Jake (2018)
- Citizen K (2019)
- Citizen Kane (1941)
- Citizen of a Kind (2024)
- Citizen Koch (2013)
- Citizen Nikanorova Waits for You (1978)
- Citizen Ruth (1996)
- Citizen Saint (1947)
- Citizen Soldier (1976)
- Citizen Toxie: The Toxic Avenger IV (2001)
- Citizen Verdict (2003)
- Citizen Vigilante (2026)
- Citizen X (1995 TV)
- The City: (1916, 1926, 1939, 1977, 1994 & 1998)
- City of Angels (1998)
- City for Conquest (1940)
- City of Damnation (2009)
- The City of the Dead (1960)
- City of Dead Men (2014)
- The City and the Dogs (1985)
- City of Ember (2008)
- City on Fire: (1979 & 1987)
- City of Ghosts: (2002 & 2017)
- City Girl: (1930, 1938 & 1984)
- City of God: (2002 & 2011)
- City of God – 10 Years Later (2013)
- City Hall (1996)
- City Heat (1984)
- City Hunter (1993)
- City of Industry (1997)
- City Island (2009)
- City of Joy (1992)
- City of Lies (2018)
- City of Life and Death (2009)
- City Lights (1931)
- City of the Living Dead (1980)
- The City of Lost Children (1995)
- City of Love (2023)
- City of Men (2007)
- A City of Sadness (1989)
- City by the Sea (2002)
- City Slickers (1991)
- City Slickers II: The Legend of Curly's Gold (1994)
- City That Never Sleeps (1953)
- The City That Never Sleeps (1924)
- City Under the Sea (1965)
- The City of Violence (2006)
- The City Without Jews (1924)
- City of Women (1980)
- Civic Duty (2006)
- A Civil Action (1998)
- The Civil Dead (2022)
- The Civil Servant (1931)
- Civil War (2024)
- Civilization (1916)
- The Civilization of Maxwell Bright (2005)
- Civilization's Child (1916)

=== Cj ===
- CJ7 (2008)

=== Cl ===
==== Cla ====
- The Claim: (1918 & 2000)
- Clair Obscur: (1988 & 2016)
- Claire: (1924 & 2001)
- Claire in Motion (2016)
- Claire of the Moon (1992)
- Claire's Camera (2017)
- Claire's Knee (1970)
- The Clairvoyant: (1924, 1935 & 1982)
- Clambake (1967)
- Clams and Mussels (2000)
- The Clan: (1920, 2005 & 2015)
- The Clan of the Cave Bear (1986)
- Clan of the White Lotus (1980)
- Clandestinos: (1987 & 2007)
- Clannad (2007)
- Clans of Intrigue (1977)
- Clap (2022)
- Clapboard Jungle (2020)
- Clapham Junction (2007 TV)
- The Clapper (2017)
- Clapping for the Wrong Reasons (2013)
- Clara: (2018 & 2019)
- Clara de Montargis (1951)
- Clara et les Chics Types (1981)
- Clara is the Price (1975)
- Clara's Ghost (2018)
- Clara's Heart (1988)
- Clare and Francis (2007 TV)
- Clarence: (1922, 1937 & 1990)
- Clarissa (1941)
- Clarita (2019)
- Clash: (2009, 2016 & 2021)
- Clash by Night: (1952 & 1963)
- Clash of Egos (2006)
- Clash of Loyalties (1983)
- Clash of the Empires (2013)
- Clash of the Titans: (1981 & 2010)
- The Clash of the Wolves (1925)
- The Class (2007 & 2008)
- Class (1983)
- Class of '44 (1973)
- Class of '61 (1993 TV)
- Class of '83 (2020)
- Class of 1984 (1982)
- Class of 1999 (1990)
- Class of 1999 II: The Substitute (1994)
- Class of 2018 (2018)
- Class Action (1991)
- Class Action Park (2020)
- Class Divide (2015)
- Class Enemy (2013)
- Class Rank (2017)
- Class Trip (1998)
- Class Warfare (2001)
- Class of Her Own 2024)
- The Class of Miss MacMichael (1978)
- Class of Nuke 'Em High (1986)
- Class of Nuke 'Em High 2: Subhumanoid Meltdown (1991)
- Class of Nuke 'Em High 3: The Good, the Bad and the Subhumanoid (1994)
- A Class to Remember (1993)
- Classe mista (1976)
- Classe tous risques (1960)
- Classic: (1998 & 2016)
- The Classic: (2001 & 2003)
- Classic – Dance of Love (2005)
- Classified: (1925 & 2024)
- Classified: The Edward Snowden Story (2014 TV)
- Classmates: (1914, 1924, 2006, 2007 & 2015)
- Classroom (2018)
- Claudia: (1943 & 1959)
- Claudine (1974)
- The Claus Family (2020)
- Claustrophobia: (2003 & 2008)
- Clavigo (1970)
- The Claw: (1918 & 1927)
- Claws (1977)
- Clay (1965)
- Clay Pigeon (1971)
- The Clay Pigeon (1949)
- Clay Pigeons (1998)
- Clayface (2026)
- A Claymation Christmas Celebration (1987 TV)

==== Cle ====
- Clean: (2004, 2021 & 2022)
- Clean and Sober (1988)
- Clean Break (2008)
- Clean Hands: (2015 & 2026)
- Clean My Name, Mr. Coroner! (2000)
- Clean Out (2003)
- Clean Pastures (1937)
- Clean Ponds (1965)
- Clean, Shaven (1994)
- Clean Slate (1994)
- Clean Sweep (1918)
- Cleaner: (2007 & 2025)
- The Cleaner (2012)
- Cleaners (2019)
- Cleanin' Up the Town: Remembering Ghostbusters (2019)
- Cleaning Time (1915)
- Cleaning Up: (1925 & 1933)
- The Cleanse (2016)
- Cleanskin (2012)
- Clear All Wires! (1933)
- Clear Blue Tuesday (2009)
- Clear Cut: The Story of Philomath, Oregon (2006)
- Clear the Decks (1929)
- Clear History (2013)
- Clear and Present Danger (1994)
- Clear Skies (1961)
- Clearcut (1991)
- The Clearing (2004)
- Clearing the Range (1931)
- Clearing Skies (2002)
- Clearing the Trail (1928)
- Clegg (1970)
- Clemency (2019)
- Clementine: (2004 & 2019)
- Cleo: (2019 Belgian & 2019 German)
- Cléo from 5 to 7 (1962)
- Cleopatra: (1912, 1917, 1928, 1934, 1963, 1970, 1999 TV, 2003, 2007 & 2013)
- Cleopatra Jones (1973)
- Cleopatra Jones and the Casino of Gold (1975)
- Clerk (1989)
- Clerks (1994)
- Clerks II (2006)
- Clerks III (2022)
- Cleveland Abduction (2015)

==== Cli ====
- Click: (2006, 2010 & 2024)
- Click Clack Jack (2008)
- Clickbait (2018)
- The Client: (1994 & 2011)
- Client 9: The Rise and Fall of Eliot Spitzer (2010)
- Cliffhanger: (1993 & 2027)
- Clifford the Big Red Dog (2021)
- Clifford's Really Big Movie (2004)
- Cliffs of Freedom (2019)
- Climates (2006)
- Climax: (1965, 2013 & 2018)
- The Climb (2017)
- The Climber: (1917, 1966 & 1975)
- Climber's High (2008)
- The Climbers: (1915, 1919, 1927 & 2019)
- Climbing the Golden Stairs (1929)
- Climbing High (1938)
- Climbing for Life (2025)
- Climbing the Matterhorn (1947)
- Climbing to Spring (2014)
- Clinger (2015)
- Clinging with Hate (2018)
- The Clinging Vine (1926)
- The Clinic (1982)
- The Clinic (2010)
- Clinical (2017)
- Clint (2017)
- Clinton (2001 TV)
- Clipped Wings: (1937 & 1953)
- Clippety Clobbered (1966)
- Clipping Adam (2004)
- The Clique (2008)
- Clive Davis: The Soundtrack of Our Lives (2017)
- Clive of India (1935)
- Clivia (1954)

==== Clo ====
- Cloaca (2003)
- Cloak & Dagger (1984)
- Cloak and Dagger (1946)
- Cloak Without Dagger (1956)
- Clochard (1932)
- Clochemelre (1948)
- Clock (2023)
- The Clock: (1917, 1945 & 2010)
- Clock Cleaners (1937)
- Clockers (1995)
- The Clockmaker (1974)
- Clockstoppers (2002)
- Clockwatchers (1997)
- Clockwise (1986)
- The Clockwork Girl (2014)
- Clockwork Mice (1995)
- A Clockwork Orange (1971)
- Cloistered Nun: Runa's Confession (1976)
- Cloned (1997 TV)
- Close: (2019 & 2022)
- Close to Eden (1991)
- Close Encounters of the Third Kind (1977)
- Close Enemies (2018)
- Close Escape (1989)
- Close Friends (1992)
- Close Harmony: (1929 & 1981)
- Close to Home (2005)
- Close to Leo (2002 TV)
- Close My Eyes (1991)
- Close Personal Friends (TBD)
- Close Range (2015)
- Close Range Love (2014)
- Close Relations: (1933 & 1935)
- Close Your Eyes (2023)
- Close Your Eyes Hind (2025)
- Close Your Eyes and Hold Me (1996)
- Close-Knit (2017)
- Close-Up: (1948 & 1990)
- Closed Circuit: (1978 & 2013)
- Closed Curtain (2013)
- Closed Doors Village (2014)
- Closed for the Season (2010)
- Closely Watched Trains (1966)
- Closer (2004)
- Closer to Home (1995)
- The Closet: (2001 & 2007)
- Closet Cases of the Nerd Kind (1980)
- Closing the Ring (2007)
- Clothes: (1914 & 1920)
- Clothes Make the Man: (1915, 1921 & 1940)
- Clothes Make the Pirate (1925)
- Clothes Make the Woman (1928)
- Clothes and the Woman (1937)
- Clothing (2019)
- Cloud (2024)
- Cloud 9: (2006, 2008 & 2014)
- Cloud Atlas (2012)
- Cloud Dancer (1980)
- Cloudburst: (1951 & 2011)
- Clouds: (2000 & 2020)
- Clouds of Glass (1958)
- Clouds in My Coffee (2004)
- Clouds Over Borsk (1960)
- Clouds Over Sidra (2015)
- Clouds of Sils Maria (2014)
- Clouds of Smoke: (1959 & 2007)
- Cloudy with a Chance of Meatballs series:
  - Cloudy with a Chance of Meatballs (2009)
  - Cloudy with a Chance of Meatballs 2 (2013)
- Cloudy Sunday (2015)
- Cloudy Times (2014)
- The Clovehitch Killer (2018)
- Clover: (1997 TV, 2014 & 2020)
- Cloverfield series:
  - Cloverfield (2008)
  - 10 Cloverfield Lane (2016)
  - The Cloverfield Paradox (2018)
- Clown (2014)
- The Clown: (1916, 1926, 1927, 1931, 1953, 1976 & 2011)
- The Clown Barber (1898)
- Clown Charly (1918)
- Clown in a Cornfield (2025)
- Clown of the Jungle (1947)
- Clown Kill (2014)
- The Clown at Midnight (1998)
- The Clown Murders (1976)
- Clown Princes (1939)
- Le Clown et ses chiens (1892)
- Clownhouse (1990)
- The Clowns (1970)

==== Clu ====
- The Club: (1980, 1994 & 2015)
- Club 60 (2013)
- The Club of Aristocrats (1937)
- The Club of the Big Deed (1927)
- Club Dread (2004)
- Club Fed (1990)
- Club Frontera (2016)
- Club Kid (2026)
- Club Life: (1986 & 2015)
- Club Paradise (1986)
- Club Sandwich (2013)
- Club Satan: The Witches Sabbath (2007)
- Club verde (1945)
- Clubbed to Death (1996)
- Clubhouse Detectives (1996)
- Clubland: (1990 TV, 1999 & 2007)
- The Clubman and the Tramp (1908)
- Clubs Are Trump (1917)
- Clue (1985)
- The Clue (1915)
- The Clue of the Missing Ape (1953)
- The Clue of the New Pin: (1929 & 1961)
- Clue of the Silver Key (1961)
- Clue of the Twisted Candle (1960)
- Clueless: (1995 & 2010)
- Cluny Brown (1946)
- Clutch (1998)

=== Co ===
- Co mój mąż robi w nocy (1934)
- Co-ed Call Girl (1996 TV)

==== Coa–Cob ====
- Coach: (1978 & 2018)
- Coach Carter (2005)
- Coach to Vienna (1966)
- Coach of the Year (1980 TV)
- Coal (2019)
- Coal Black and de Sebben Dwarfs (1943)
- Coal Face (1935)
- Coal Miner's Daughter (1980)
- Coalition (2015 TV)
- Coals of Fire: (1915 & 1918)
- Coast to Coast: (1980, 1987 & 2003)
- Coast Guard (1939)
- The Coast Guard (2002)
- Coast of Skeletons (1965)
- Coastal (2025)
- Coastal Command (1942)
- Coastal Elites (2020 TV)
- Coasts in the Mist (1986)
- Cobain (2018)
- Cobalt Blue (2022)
- Cobb (1994)
- The Cobbler (2014)
- Coboy Junior: The Movie (2013)
- Cobra: (1925, 1986, 1991, 2012 & 2022)
- The Cobra (1967)
- Cobra Verde (1987)
- Cobra Woman (1944)
- Cobweb: (1936, 2023 American & 2023 South Korean)
- The Cobweb: (1917 & 1955)

==== Coc ====
- The Coca-Cola Kid (1985)
- Cocagne (1961)
- Cocaine (1922)
- Cocaine Bear (2023)
- Cocaine Cowboys: (1979 & 2006)
- Cocaine Cowboys 2 (2008)
- Cocaine Crabs from Outer Space (2022)
- Cocaine Godmother (2017)
- Cocaine Shark (2023)
- Cocaine Wars (1985)
- Cocaine Werewolf (2024)
- Cock of the Air (1932)
- Cock and Bull (2016)
- A Cock and Bull Story (2005)
- Cock o' the North (1935)
- Cock of the Roost (1925)
- Cock o' the Walk (1930)
- Cock o' the Walk (1935)
- Cock o' the Walk (1953)
- Cockfighter (1974)
- Cockpit: (2012 & 2017)
- Cocksucker Blues (1972)
- Cocktail: (1988, 2006, 2010, 2012 & 2020)
- Cocktail Hour (1933)
- Cocktails (1928)
- Coco: (2009 & 2017)
- Coco 2 (2029)
- Coco Before Chanel (2009)
- Coco Chanel (2008 TV)
- Coco Chanel & Igor Stravinsky (2009)
- Cocoanut (1939)
- Cocoanut Grove (1938)
- The Cocoanuts (1929)
- CoComelon: The Movie (2027)
- Cocoon (1985)
- Cocoon – One Summer of Girlhood (2025)
- Cocoon: The Return (1988)
- Cocooned (2021 TV)

==== Cod ====
- Coda: (1987 TV & 2019)
- CODA (2021)
- Code 3 (2024)
- Code 8: (2016 & 2019)
- Code 8: Part II (2024)
- Code 13 (2007)
- Code 46 (2003)
- Code: Debugging the Gender Gap (2015)
- Code of the Air (1928)
- Code Black (2013)
- Code Blue (2011)
- Code Breakers (2005 TV)
- Code of the Cactus (1939)
- Code of the Cow Country (1927)
- Code of the Fearless (1939)
- Code Gray: Ethical Dilemmas in Nursing (1984)
- Code of Honor: (1930 & 2016)
- Code of the Lawless (1945)
- Code Name: Black and White (1988)
- Code Name: The Cleaner (2007)
- Code Name: Diamond Head (1977 TV)
- Code Name: Emerald (1985)
- Code Name: Emperor (2022)
- Code Name: Heraclitus (1967 TV)
- Code Name: Jackal (2012)
- Code Name: Jaguar (1965)
- Code Name: Tiranga (2022)
- Code Name: Wild Geese (1984)
- Code Name Abdul (2017)
- Code Name Banshee (2022)
- Code Name Melville (2008)
- Code of the Northwest (1926)
- Code of the Outlaw (1942)
- Code of the Prairie (1944)
- Code of the Range (1936)
- Code of the Rangers (1938)
- Code Rush (2000)
- Code of the Saddle (1947)
- Code of the Sea (1924)
- Code of the Secret Service (1939)
- Code of Silence: (1985, 2014 & 2015)
- Code of the Silver Sage (1950)
- Code of the Streets (1939)
- Code Two (1953)
- Code Unknown (2000)
- Code of the West: (1925, 1947 & 2012)
- Code of the Wilderness (1924)
- Code Wilo (2019)
- Codebreaker (2011 TV)
- Coded Bias (2020)
- Codename Coq Rouge (1989)
- Codename Cougar (1989)
- Cody of the Pony Express (1950)

==== Coe–Cok ====
- Coexistence, My Ass! (2025)
- Coextinction (2021)
- Coffee (2022)
- Coffee Ani Barach Kahi (2015)
- A Coffee in Berlin (2012)
- Coffee Bloom (2014)
- Coffee and Cigarettes (2003)
- Coffee and Cigarettes: Somewhere in California (1993)
- Coffee with D (2017)
- Coffee Date (2006)
- Coffee with Kadhal (2022)
- Coffee & Kareem (2020)
- Coffee, Kill Boss (2013)
- Coffee with a Killer (2025)
- Coffee Mate (2016)
- The Coffee Table (2022)
- Coffee, Tea or Me? (1973 TV)
- Coffee Town (2013)
- Coffee With My Wife (2013)
- Coffin (2011)
- The Coffin (2008)
- The Coffin Affair (1980)
- Coffin Baby (2013)
- Coffin from Hong Kong (1964)
- The Coffin in the Mountain (2014)
- Coffin Rock (2009)
- A Coffin for the Sheriff (1965)
- The Coffin Ship (1911)
- Coffy (1973)
- C.O.G. (2025)
- Cohabitation (1918)
- The Cohasset Snuff Film (2012)
- Cohen on the Bridge (2009)
- Cohen Saves the Flag (1913)
- Cohen and Tate (1989)
- Cohen's Luck (1915)
- The Cohens and Kellys series:
  - The Cohens and Kellys (1926)
  - The Cohens and the Kellys in Paris (1928)
  - The Cohens and the Kellys in Atlantic City (1929)
  - The Cohens and the Kellys in Scotland (1930)
  - The Cohens and the Kellys in Africa (1930)
  - The Cohens and Kellys in Hollywood (1932)
  - The Cohens and Kellys in Trouble (1933)
- Coherence (2013)
- Coin Heist (2017)
- Coin Locker Girl (2015)
- Coincidence (1921)
- Coincidences (1947)
- Coins in the Fountain (1990) (TV)
- The Cokeville Miracle (2015)

==== Col ====
- Cold Cold Heart (2007)
- Cold Comfort Farm (1995)
- Cold Creek Manor (2003)
- Cold Dog Soup (1990)
- Cold Eyes (2013)
- Cold Eyes of Fear (1971)
- Cold Fever (1995)
- Cold Heaven (1991)
- Cold Hell (2017)
- Cold in July (2014)
- The Cold Lands (2013)
- Cold Light of Day (1989)
- The Cold Light of Day (2012)
- Cold Mountain (2003)
- A Cold Night's Death (1973 TV)
- Cold Prey (2006)
- Cold Pursuit (2019)
- Cold Showers (2005)
- Cold Souls (2009)
- Cold Storage (2026)
- Cold Sweat: (1970 & 1993)
- Cold Turkey (1971)
- Cold War: (2012 & 2018)
- Cold War 2 (2016)
- Cold Water (1994)
- Cold Winter Sun (2004)
- The Colditz Story (1955)
- Coldwater (2013)
- Collaborator (2012)
- Collateral (2004)
- Collateral Beauty (2016)
- Collateral Damage (2002)
- The Collection (2012)
- La Collectionneuse (1967)
- Collective (2019)
- The Collector: (1965 & 2009)
- College: (1927 & 2008)
- The College Hero (1927)
- College Road Trip (2008)
- Collide (2016)
- The Collingswood Story (2002)
- Collision Course (1989)
- Cologne: From the Diary of Ray and Esther (1939)
- Colombiana (2011)
- The Colonel: (1917 & 1974)
- Colonel Chabert: (1943 & 1994)
- Colonel Panics (2016)
- Colonel Redl: (1925 & 1985)
- Color of a Brisk and Leaping Day (1996)
- The Color of Friendship (2000)
- The Color of Lies (1999)
- Color Me Blood Red (1965)
- Color Me True (2018)
- The Color of Money (1986)
- Color of Night (1994)
- Color Out of Space (2019)
- The Color of Paradise (2000)
- The Color of Pomegranates (1969)
- The Color Purple: (1985 & 2023)
- Colorado Pioneers (1945)
- Colorado Territory (1949)
- Colorful (2010)
- Colorful Stage! The Movie: A Miku Who Can't Sing (2025)
- Colors (1988)
- Colossal (2016)
- Colossal Youth (2006)
- The Colossus of New York (1958)
- The Colossus of Rhodes (1961)
- Colossus: The Forbin Project (1970)
- Colour Blossoms (2004)
- The Colour of Magic (2008)
- Colour Me Kubrick (2006)
- Columbus: (2015 & 2017)
- Columbus Circle (2012)
- The Columnist (2019)

==== Com ====
- Coma: (1978, 2009, 2020 & 2022)
- Comanche Station (1960)
- The Comancheros (1961)
- Comandante (2003)
- Combat Academy (1986 TV)
- Combat Shock (1986)
- Combat Wombat (2020)
- Combat Wombat: Back 2 Back (2024)
- Come Along, Do! (1898)
- Come Back to the Five and Dime, Jimmy Dean, Jimmy Dean (1982)
- Come Back, Africa (1959)
- Come Back, Little Sheba (1952)
- Come Blow Your Horn (1973)
- Come to Daddy (2019)
- Come Drink with Me (1966)
- Come Fill the Cup (1951)
- Come and Get It: (1929 & 1936)
- Come Play (2020)
- Come and See (1985)
- Come See the Paradise (1990)
- Come September (1961)
- Come True (2020)
- Come Undone: (2000 & 2010)
- The Comebacks (2007)
- Comedian (2003)
- The Comedy of Terrors (1964)
- Comes a Horseman (1978)
- Comfort and Joy: (1984 & 2003 TV)
- The Comfort of Strangers (1991)
- Comic Book Confidential (1988)
- Comic Book: The Movie (2004)
- Comic-Con Episode IV: A Fan's Hope (2011)
- Comic Costume Race (1896)
- Coming to America series:
  - Coming to America (1988)
  - Coming 2 America (2021)
- Coming Apart (1969)
- Coming Home: (1973, 1978, 2012, 2014, 2018 & 2020)
- Coming Home in the Dark (2021)
- Coming Out: (1989, 2000 & 2013)
- Coming Soon: (1982, 1999, 2008 & 2014)
- Command Decision (1949)
- Commandments (1997)
- Commando: (1962, 1985 & 1988)
- Commando series:
  - Commando: A One Man Army (2013)
  - Commando 2: The Black Money Trail (2017)
  - Commando 3 (2019)
- La commare secca (1962)
- Comme un aimant (2000)
- Commissar (1967)
- The Commitments (1991)
- Committed: (1991 & 2000)
- Common Ground: (1916, 2000 TV & 2002)
- Common Law Cabin (1967)
- A Common Thread (2004)
- Communication Breakdown (2004)
- Communion: (1989 & 2016)
- The Commuter (2018)
- Companeros (1972)
- Companion (2025)
- The Companion (2015)
- Companion Wanted (1932)
- The Company (2003)
- The Company Men (2011)
- The Company of Wolves (1984)
- The Company You Keep (2012)
- Compartment No. 6 (2021)
- The Competition: (1980 & 2018)
- A Complete Unknown (2024)
- Compliance (2012)
- Compulsion: (1959, 2013 & 2016)
- The Computer Wore Tennis Shoes (1969)
- Comrade (2017)
- Comrade Abram (1919)
- Comrade in America (2017)
- Comrade Arseny (1964)
- Comrade Chkalov Crosses the North Pole (1990)
- Comrade Kim Goes Flying (2012)
- Comrade Pedersen (2006)
- Comrade X (1940)
- Comrades: (1919, 1921, 1928 & 1986)
- Comrades at Sea (1938)
- Comrades: Almost a Love Story (1996)
- Comradeship (1919)

==== Con ====
- Con Air (1997)
- Conan the Barbarian: (1982 & 2011)
- Conan the Destroyer (1984)
- The Concert: (1921, 1931 & 2009)
- The Concert for Bangladesh (1972)
- Concert at the End of Summer (1980)
- Conclave (2024)
- The Concorde ... Airport '79 (1979)
- Concrete (2004)
- Concrete Cowboy (2020)
- Concrete Cowboys (1979 TV)
- Concrete Utopia (2021)
- The Concubine (2012)
- Concussion: (2013 & 2015)
- Condemned: (1929 & 2015)
- The Condemned: (1975 & 2007)
- The Condemned 2 (2015)
- Cone of Silence (1960)
- Coneheads (1993)
- Coney Island: (1917, 1928, 1943 & 1991)
- Coney Island Baby (2003)
- Confession: (1929, 1937, 1955, 2014 & 2015)
- The Confession: (1920, 1970, 1999, 2002 & 2010)
- Confessions: (1925 & 2010)
- Confessions series:
  - Confessions of a Window Cleaner (1974)
  - Confessions of a Pop Performer (1975)
  - Confessions of a Driving Instructor (1976)
  - Confessions from a Holiday Camp (1977)
- Confessions of a Brazilian Call Girl (2011)
- Confessions of a Co-Ed (1931)
- Confessions of a Cuckoo (2021)
- Confessions of a Dangerous Mind (2002)
- Confessions of a Frustrated Housewife (1976)
- Confessions of a Go-Go Girl (2008 TV)
- Confessions of a Hitman (2021)
- Confessions of an Invisible Girl (2021)
- Confessions of a Lady Cop (1976)
- Confessions of a Monk (1922)
- Confessions of a Nazi Spy (1939)
- Confessions of an Opium Eater (1962)
- Confessions of a Pit Fighter (2005)
- Confessions of a Police Captain (1971)
- Confessions of a Psycho Cat (1968)
- Confessions of a Queen (1925)
- Confessions of a Serial Killer (1985)
- Confessions of a Sexist Pig (1998)
- Confessions of a Shopaholic (2009)
- Confessions of a Sociopathic Social Climber (2005 TV)
- Confessions of a Sorority Girl (1994 TV)
- Confessions of a Superhero (2007)
- Confessions of a Taxi Driver (1974)
- Confessions of a Teenage Drama Queen (2004)
- Confessions of a Teenage Jesus Jerk (2017)
- Confessions of a Thug (2005)
- Confessions of a Vice Baron (1943)
- Confessions of a Wife (1928)
- Confessions of a Womanizer (2014)
- Confetti: (1927 & 2006)
- Confidence: (1922, 1933, 1980 & 2003)
- Confidential: (1935 & 1986)
- Confidential Agent (1945)
- Confidential Assignment (2017)
- Confidential Assignment 2: International (2022)
- Confidential Informant (2023)
- Confidentially Yours (1983)
- Conflict: (1936, 1938 & 1945)
- The Conformist: (1970 & 2017)
- The Confrontation (1969)
- Confucius: (1940 & 2010)
- Congo (1995)
- Congo Jazz (1930)
- The Congress: (1988 & 2013)
- Congress Dances (1932)
- The Congress Dances (1955)
- Conjurer Making Ten Hats in Sixty Seconds (1896)
- Conjuring (1896)
- The Conjuring series:
  - The Conjuring (2013)
  - The Conjuring 2 (2016)
  - The Conjuring: The Devil Made Me Do It (2021)
  - The Conjuring: Last Rites (2025)
- A Connecticut Yankee in King Arthur's Court: (1921 & 1949)
- Connecting Rooms (1970)
- Connie and Carla (2004)
- The Conqueror: (1917 & 1956)
- The Conquerors: (1932 & 2013)
- Conquest: (1928, 1937, 1983 & 1998)
- The Conquest: (1996 & 2011)
- Conquest of the Air (1936)
- The Conquest of Everest (1953)
- Conquest of the Planet of the Apes (1972)
- Conquest of Space (1955)
- Conrack (1974)
- Consent: (2023 & 2023 TV)
- Consenting Adults: (1992 & 2007 TV)
- Conspiracy: (1927, 1930, 1939, 2000, 2001 TV & 2008)
- The Conspiracy: (1913, 1914, 1916 & 2012)
- Conspiracy Theory (1997)
- Conspirator (1949)
- The Conspirator (2010)
- Conspirators (2013)
- The Conspirators: (1924, 1944 & 1969)
- A Constant Forge (2000)
- The Constant Gardener (2005)
- The Constant Nymph: (1928, 1933 & 1943)
- Constantine (2005)
- Constellation (2007)
- Consuming Passions (1989)
- Contact: (1978, 1992, 1997 & 2009)
- The Contact: (1963 & 1997)
- Contagion: (1987 & 2011)
- Contempt (1963)
- The Contender: (1944 & 2000)
- Continental Divide (1981)
- Contraband: (1925, 1940, 1980 & 2012)
- Contraband Spain (1955)
- Contract: (1985 & 2008)
- The Contract: (1971, 1978, 2006 & 2016)
- Contracted (2013)
- The Contractor: (2007 & 2013)
- Control: (1987, 2003, 2004, 2007 & 2013)
- Control Freak (2025)
- Control Room (2004)
- The Convent: (1995, 2000 & 2018)
- The Conversation (1974)
- Conversations with Other Women (2006)
- Convict (1936)
- The Convict (1910)
- Convict 13 (1920)
- The Convicted (1927)
- Conviction: (2002 TV & 2010)
- Convicts (1991)
- Convoy: (1927, 1940 & 1978)

==== Coo–Cot ====
- Coogan's Bluff (1968)
- The Cook (1917, 1918 & 1965)
- The Cook, the Thief, His Wife & Her Lover (1989)
- Cook Up a Storm (2017)
- Cookie (1989)
- Cookie's Fortune (1999)
- The Cookout (2004)
- Cool and the Crazy (1994)
- Cool Hand Luke (1967)
- Cool as Ice (1991)
- Cool Runnings (1993)
- Cool World (1992)
- The Cool World (1963)
- A Cool, Dry Place (1998)
- The Cooler (2003)
- Cooley High (1975)
- Coolie No. 1 (2020)
- Coonskin (1975)
- Cooties (2014)
- Cop (1988)
- A Cop (1972)
- The Cop: (1928 & 1970)
- Cop and a Half (1993)
- Cop Hater (1958)
- Cop Land (1997)
- A Cop Movie (2021)
- Cop Out (2010)
- Cop This (2026)
- Copper Mountain (1983)
- Copperhead (2013)
- Cops (1922)
- Cops and Robbers: (1951, 1973 & 1997)
- Cops and Robbersons (1994)
- Copshop (2021)
- Copycat (1995)
- Copying Beethoven (2006)
- Coral Reef Adventure (2003)
- Coraline (2009)
- Corazón salvaje (1956)
- Le Corbeau (1943)
- Corbett and Courtney Before the Kinetograph (1894)
- The Corbett-Fitzsimmons Fight (1897)
- The Core (2003)
- Coriolanus (2011)
- Corky Romano (2001)
- The Corn Is Green (1945)
- A Corner in Wheat (1909)
- Cornered (1945)
- A Corny Concerto (1943)
- Corporate Animals (2019)
- Corporate Retreat (2026)
- The Corporation: (2003 & 2012)
- The Corpse of Anna Fritz (2015)
- Corpse Bride (2005)
- The Corpse Grinders (1971)
- Corpse Party (2015)
- The Corpse Vanishes (1942)
- Corpus Christi: (2014 & 2019)
- Corrections Class (2014)
- Corrective Measures (2022)
- The Correspondent (2024)
- Corridor (2012)
- The Corridor: (1968, 1995, 2010 & 2013)
- Corridor of Mirrors (1948)
- Corridors of Blood (1958)
- Corrina, Corrina (1994)
- The Corruptor (1999)
- Corsage (2022)
- Corso: The Last Beat (2009)
- Corvette K-225 (1943)
- Corvette Summer (1978)
- Cosi (1996)
- Cosmic Sin (2021)
- Cosmopolis (2012)
- Cosmos: (1996, 2010, 2015 & 2019)
- Costa Brava, Lebanon (2021)
- The Costello Case (1930)
- Cosy Dens (1999)
- The Cottage (2008)
- A Cottage on Dartmoor (1929)
- The Cotton Club (1984)
- Cotton Fever (2026)

==== Cou ====
- The Couch Trip (1987)
- Le Coucher de la Mariée (1896)
- The Counselor (2013)
- Counsellor at Law (1933)
- Count Dracula: (1970 & 1977 TV)
- Count Dracula's Great Love (1974)
- The Count of Monte Cristo: (1912, 1913, 1934, 1942, 1943, 1953, 1954, 1961, 1975 TV & 2002)
- Count Three and Pray (1955)
- Count Yorga, Vampire (1970)
- Countdown: (1968, 2004, 2011 & 2019)
- Countdown to Looking Glass (1984) (TV)
- Counterfeit: (1919 & 1936)
- The Counterfeit Traitor (1962)
- The Counterfeiters: (1948, 2007 & 2010 TV)
- The Counterfeiters of Paris (1961)
- Countess Dracula (1971)
- A Countess from Hong Kong (1967)
- Country (1984)
- The Country Bears (2002)
- The Country Girl: (1915 & 1954)
- Country Strong (2011)
- The Countryman and the Cinematograph (1901)
- Coup de Grâce: (1969 & 1976)
- Coup de Torchon (1981)
- Couples Retreat (2009)
- Couples Weekend (2026)
- Courage: (1930, 1939 & 2011)
- Courage for Every Day (1965)
- Courage Under Fire (1996)
- Courageous (2011)
- The Courier: (2012, 2019 & 2020)
- Court (2014)
- The Court of Honor (1948)
- The Court Jester (1956)
- The Courtship of Eddie's Father (1963)
- Cousin Cousine (1976)
- Cousins: (1989, 2014 & 2021)
- Les Cousins (1959)
- Couture (2025)

==== Cov–Coz ====
- The Cove (2009)
- Coven: (1997, 2020 & 2023)
- The Coven (2015)
- The Covenant: (1985 TV, 2006 & 2023)
- A Covenant with Death (1967)
- The Cover (2021)
- Cover Girl (1944)
- The Cover Girl and the Cop (1989 TV)
- Cover Girl Killer (1959)
- Cover Girl Models (1975)
- Cover Me (1995)
- Cover Me Babe (1970)
- Cover Story: (2000 & 2002)
- Cover Up (1949)
- Cover-Up (2025)
- The Covered Trail (1924)
- The Covered Wagon (1923)
- Covered Wagon Raid (1950)
- Covered Wagon Trails (1940)
- Covergirl (1984)
- Covert Action (1978)
- Covert One: The Hades Factor (2006 TV)
- The Coverup (2008)
- Cow: (2009 & 2021)
- The Cow: (1969 & 1989)
- Cow Belles (2006) (TV)
- Cow Country (1953)
- Cow on the Moon (1959)
- A Cow at My Table (1998)
- Cow Town (1950)
- The Coward: (1915, 1927, 1939 & 1953)
- Coward Hero (2019)
- Cowards: (1970 & 2008)
- Cowards Bend the Knee (2003)
- Cowboy: (1958, 1966, 2011 & 2013)
- Cowboy Bebop: The Movie (2001)
- Cowboy Blues (1946)
- Cowboy from Brooklyn (1938)
- Cowboy Canteen (1944)
- Cowboy Cavalier (1948)
- Cowboy Commandos (1943)
- Cowboy Counsellor (1932)
- Cowboy Holiday (1934)
- Cowboy from Lonesome River (1944)
- Cowboy and the Prizefighter (1949)
- Cowboy and the Senorita (1944)
- Cowboy Serenade (1942)
- Cowboy Up (2001)
- The Cowboy Way (1994)
- The Cowboys (1972)
- Cowboys & Aliens (2011)
- A Cowgirl's Story (2017)
- A Coy Decoy (1941)
- Coyote: (1992, 2007, 2013 & 2022)
- The Coyote (1955)
- Coyote and Bronca (1980)
- Coyote Lake (2019)
- Coyote Trails (1935)
- Coyote Ugly (2000)
- Coyote vs. Acme (2026)
- Coyote: The Mike Plant Story (2017)
- The Coyote's Justice (1956)
- Coyotes (2025)
- Coz Ov Moni (2010)
- Coz Ov Moni 2 (2013)

=== Cq ===
- CQ (2001)

=== Cr ===
==== Cra ====
- Crab Goalkeeper (2006)
- Crabs! (2021)
- Crack: Cocaine, Corruption & Conspiracy (2021)
- A Crack in the Floor (2001)
- Crack House (1989)
- Crack in the Mirror (1960)
- Crack in the World (1965)
- Crack-Up: (1936 & 1946)
- Cracked (2024)
- Cracked Actor (1975 TV)
- Cracked Eggs and Noodles (2005)
- Cracked Ice (1938)
- Crackerjack: (1938, 1994 & 2002)
- Crackers: (1984, 1998 & 2011)
- Cracking Up: (1983 & 1994)
- Cracks (2009)
- Cradle 2 the Grave (2003)
- Cradle of Fear (2001)
- Cradle Will Rock (1999)
- The Craft (1996)
- The Craft: Legacy (2020)
- Craig Before the Creek (2023) (TV)
- The Cranes Are Flying (1957)
- Crank (2006)
- Crank: High Voltage (2009)
- Crash: (1974, 1996 & 2004)
- Crash Landing: (1958 & 1999)
- Crash Pad (2017)
- Crash Site (2011)
- Crashout (1955)
- Crater (2023)
- The Crater Lake Monster (1977)
- Crawl: (2011 & 2019)
- Crawlers (2026)
- The Crawlers (1993)
- The Crawling Eye (1958)
- Crawlspace: (1972 TV, 1986, 2004, 2012 & 2013)
- Crayon (2010)
- Crazed Fruit (1956)
- The Crazies: (1973 & 2010)
- Crazy: (1999, 2000 & 2007)
- Crazy in Alabama (1999)
- Crazy Eights (2006)
- Crazy English (1999)
- Crazy Heart (2009)
- Crazy As Hell (2002)
- Crazy Love: (1979, 1987, 1993, 2007 & 2014)
- Crazy Money (1981)
- Crazy New Year’s Eve (2015)
- Crazy Old Lady (2026)
- The Crazy Ray (1924)
- Crazy Rich Asians (2018)
- Crazy Rook (2015)
- Crazy Stone (2006)
- The Crazy Stranger (1997)
- Crazy, Stupid, Love. (2011)
- Crazy/Beautiful (2001)

==== Cre ====
- A Creampuff Romance (1916)
- Created Equal (2017)
- Creating Karma (2006)
- Creating Rem Lezar (1989)
- Creation: (1922, 1931 & 2009)
- The Creation of the Humanoids (1962)
- The Creation of Meaning (2014)
- Creation Stories (2021)
- Creative Control (2015)
- Creator (1985)
- The Creator: (1999 & 2023)
- The Creators (2012)
- Creators: The Past (2020)
- The Creatress (2019)
- Creature: (1985, 1999 & 2011)
- The Creature (1924)
- Creature 3D (2014)
- Creature with the Atom Brain (1955)
- The Creature Below (2016)
- Creature from the Black Lagoon (1954)
- Creature from Black Lake (1976)
- Creature with the Blue Hand (1967)
- Creature of Destruction (1967)
- Creature from the Haunted Sea (1961)
- The Creature of the Sunny Side Up Trailer Park (2004)
- Creature Unknown (2004)
- Creature of the Walking Dead (1965)
- The Creature Walks Among Us (1956)
- The Creature Wasn't Nice (1983)
- Creatures from the Abyss (1994)
- Creatures of the Night (1934)
- Credence (2015)
- Creditors: (1988 & 2015)
- Credo: (1997 & 2008)
- Creed series:
  - Creed (2015)
  - Creed II (2018)
  - Creed III (2023)
- Creep: (2004 & 2014)
- Creep 2 (2017)
- The Creeper (1948)
- The Creeping (2022)
- The Creeping Flesh (1973)
- The Creeping Garden (2014)
- Creeping Shadows (1931)
- The Creeping Terror (1964)
- Creepozoids (1987)
- Creeps (1956)
- The Creeps (1997)
- Creepshow series:
  - Creepshow (1982)
  - Creepshow 2 (1987)
  - Creepshow 3 (2007)
- Creepy (2016)
- The Creepy Line (2018)
- Creezy (1974)
- The Cremator (1969)
- The Cremators (1972)
- Creo en Dios (1941)
- Creo en ti (1960)
- Creole Connections (1986)
- Crescendo: (1970 & 2019)
- The Crescent (2017)
- Crescent City (2024)
- The Crescent Moon (2015)
- Crest of Betrayal (1994)
- Crew (2024)
- The Crew: (1928, 1935, 2000, 2008 & 2015)
- The Crew of the Dora (1943)

==== Cri ====
- Cri de pierre (1986)
- Cría Cuervos (1976)
- A Cricket in the Ear (1976)
- Cricket Girls & Beer (2011)
- The Cricket on the Hearth: (1909 & 1923)
- Crickets (2006)
- Cries from the Deep (1982)
- Cries from the Heart (1994 TV)
- Cries in the Night (1980)
- Cries from Syria (2017)
- Cries Unheard: The Donna Yaklich Story (1994)
- Cries and Whispers (1973)
- Crime 101 (2026)
- Crime After Crime (2011)
- Crime After School: (1959 & 1975)
- Crime Against Joe (1956)
- A Crime on the Bayou (2020)
- Crime Boss (1972)
- Crime Branch (1990)
- Crime Busters (1977)
- Crime of the Century: (1946 & 1996 TV)
- The Crime of the Century: (1933 & 2021)
- Crime at the Chinese Restaurant (1981)
- Crime at the Concert Mayol (1954)
- Crime in Connecticut: The Story of Alex Kelly (1999)
- Crime at Dawn (1960)
- Crime Doctor (1943)
- The Crime of Dr. Crespi (1935)
- The Crime of Father Amaro (2002)
- Crime File (1999)
- Crime Hunter (1989)
- Crime, Inc. (1945)
- Crime Kings (1998)
- The Crime of Monsieur Lange (1936)
- Crime in a Music Hall (1968)
- Crime by Night (1944)
- Crime Is Our Business (2008)
- Crime Over London (1936)
- A Crime in Paradise (2001)
- Crime of Passion (1957)
- Crime and Punishment: (1917, 1923, 1935 American, 1935 French, 1945, 1951, 1956, 1970, 1983, 1998 TV & 2002)
- Crime and Punishment in Suburbia (2000)
- Crime and Punishment U.S.A. (1959)
- Crime Reporter Holm (1932)
- Crime Ring (1938)
- Crime Scenes (2000)
- Crime Spree (2003)
- Crime Story: (1993 & 2021)
- Crime in the Streets (1956)
- Crime in the Sun (1947)
- Crime Takes a Holiday (1938)
- Crime Tango (1960)
- Crime Unlimited (1935)
- Crime Wave: (1954, 1985 & 2018)
- Crime Without Passion (1934)
- Crime Zone (1988)
- Crimes of the Black Cat (1972)
- Crimes of the Future: (1970 & 2022)
- Crimes of the Heart (1986)
- Crimes and Misdemeanors (1989)
- Crimes of Passion: (1984 & 2013)
- Crimewave (1985)
- Criminal: (2004 & 2016)
- Criminal Law (1989)
- The Criminal Life of Archibaldo de la Cruz (1955)
- Criminal Lovers (1999)
- Crimson Peak (2015)
- The Crimson Permanent Assurance (1983)
- The Crimson Pirate (1952)
- The Crimson Rivers (2000)
- Crimson Rivers II: Angels of the Apocalypse (2004)
- Crimson Tide (1995)
- Crip Camp (2020)
- Crippled Avengers (1978)
- Crisis: (1939, 1946, 1950, 1972 TV & 2021)
- Crisis: Behind a Presidential Commitment (1963)
- Criss Cross (1949)
- CrissCross (1992)
- Christ Stopped at Eboli (1979)
- Critic's Choice (1963)
- Critters series:
  - Critters (1986)
  - Critters 2: The Main Course (1988)
  - Critters 3 (1991)
  - Critters 4 (1992)
  - Critters Attack! (2019)

==== Cro ====
- Croaked: Frog Monster from Hell (1980)
- Croc (2007 TV)
- Crock of Gold: A Few Rounds with Shane MacGowan (2020)
- Crocodile: (1980, 1996 & 2000)
- The Crocodile (2005)
- Crocodile 2: Death Swamp (2002)
- Crocodile Dundee series:
  - Crocodile Dundee (1986)
  - Crocodile Dundee II (1988)
  - Crocodile Dundee in Los Angeles (2001)
- The Crocodile Hunter: Collision Course (2002)
- Crocodiles (2025)
- Crocodiles in Amsterdam (1990)
- Croesus (1960)
- Cromartie High – The Movie (2005)
- Cromwell (1970)
- Cronos (1993)
- The Croods (2013)
- The Croods: A New Age (2020)
- Crook (2010)
- Crooked Alley (1923)
- Crooked Arrows (2012)
- Crooked Business (2008)
- Crooked Earth (2001)
- Crooked Hearts (1991)
- Crooked House (2017)
- Crooked River (1950)
- Crooked Straight (1919)
- Crooked Streets (1920)
- Crooklyn (1994)
- Crooks Anonymous (1962)
- The Crop (2004)
- Cropsey (2009)
- Cross Creek (1983)
- Cross of Iron (1977)
- A Cross the Universe (2008)
- Crossed Lines (2007)
- Crossed Swords: (1954 & 1977)
- Crossfire (1947)
- Crossing the Bridge: The Sound of Istanbul (2005)
- Crossing Delancey (1988)
- The Crossing: (1990, 2000 TV, 2010, 2014 & 2020)
- The Crossing Guard (1995)
- Crossing Over (2009)
- Crossover: (1980 & 2006)
- Crossroads: (1937, 1938, 1942, 1976, 1986, 1998 & 2002)
- Crouching Tiger, Hidden Dragon (2000)
- Crouching Tiger, Hidden Dragon: Sword of Destiny (2016)
- Croupier (1998)
- The Crow series:
  - The Crow: (1994 & 2024)
  - The Crow: City of Angels (1996)
  - The Crow: Salvation (2000)
  - The Crow: Wicked Prayer (2005)
- The Crowd (1928)
- The Crowd Roars: (1932 & 1938)
- Crowhaven Farm (1970) (TV)
- Crown Heights (2017)
- Crown Vic (2019)
- Crowned and Dangerous (1997)
- Crows Explode (2014)
- Crows and Sparrows (1949)

==== Cru ====
- The Crucible: (1914, 1957, 1996 & 2011)
- Crucible of Empire (1999 TV)
- Crucible of Horror (1971)
- Crucible of Terror (1971)
- Crucified Girl (1929)
- The Crucified Lovers (1954)
- The Crucifixion (2017)
- Crude: (2007 & 2009)
- Crude Oil (2008)
- Crude Set Drama (1895)
- Cruel Destiny (1944)
- Cruel Female Love Suicide (1970)
- Cruel Gun Story (1964)
- Cruel Intentions series:
  - Cruel Intentions (1999)
  - Cruel Intentions 2 (2001)
  - Cruel Intentions 3 (2004)
- Cruel Jaws (1995)
- Cruel Map of Women's Bodies (1967)
- Cruel but Necessary (2005)
- Cruel Passion (1977)
- The Cruel Sea: (1953 & 1972)
- Cruel Story of Youth (1960)
- Cruel Summer: (2012 & 2016)
- Cruel and Unusual: (2006 & 2014)
- Cruel Winter Blues (2006)
- Cruel World (2005)
- Cruel, Cruel Love (1914)
- Cruella (2021)
- Cruelty: (1959 & 2016)
- Cruelty: Black Rose Torture (1975)
- Cruise (2018)
- Cruise of the Gods (2002 TV)
- Cruise of the Jasper B (1926)
- Cruise Into Terror (1978)
- Cruise for the Unknown One (1948)
- Cruise of the Zaca (1952)
- Cruiser Emden (1932)
- Cruisin' Down the River (1953)
- Cruisin' J-Town (1975)
- Cruising (1980)
- Cruising Bar (1989)
- Cruising Bar 2 (2008)
- Crulic: The Path to Beyond (2011)
- Crumb (1994)
- Crumb Catcher (2023)
- Crumbs (2015)
- Crusade in Jeans (2006)
- The Crusades (1935)
- Crush: (1972, 1992, 2001, 2009 Australian, 2009 Russian, 2013, 2014 & 2022)
- The Crush (1993)
- Crush and Blush (2008)
- Crush Pu (2023)
- Crush the Skull (2015)
- Crusoe (1988)
- Crust (2023)
- Crustacés & Coquillages (2005)
- Crutch (2004)

==== Cry ====
- Cry Baby Lane (2000 TV)
- Cry of the Banshee (1970)
- Cry of Battle (1963)
- Cry of the Black Wolves (1972)
- Cry Blood, Apache (1970)
- Cry Chicago (1969)
- Cry of the City (1948)
- Cry Danger (1951)
- A Cry in the Dark (1988)
- Cry Freedom (1987)
- Cry Freetown (2000)
- Cry for Happy (1961)
- Cry 'Havoc' (1943)
- Cry for Help (1928)
- Cry of the Hunted (1953)
- Cry of the Innocent (1980)
- Cry Macho (2021)
- Cry for Me, Billy (1972)
- Cry Me a River (2008)
- Cry Me a Sad River (2018)
- Cry Murder (1950)
- Cry No Fear (2018)
- Cry Panic (1974 TV)
- Cry of a Prostitute (1974)
- Cry for the Strangers (1982 TV)
- Cry Terror! (1958)
- Cry Tough (1959)
- Cry Uncle! (1971)
- Cry Vengeance (1954)
- Cry Vengeance! (1961 TV)
- Cry of the Werewolf (1944)
- A Cry in the Wild (1990)
- Cry in the Wild: The Taking of Peggy Ann (1991 TV)
- Cry of the Wild (1972)
- Cry Wilderness (1987)
- Cry of the Winged Serpent (2005)p
- Cry Wolf: (1947, 1969 & 2005)
- Cry Woman (2002)
- Cry, the Beloved Country: (1951 & 1995)
- Cry, Onion! (1975)
- Cry-Baby (1990)
- Crying 100 Times: Every Raindrop Falls (2013)
- Crying for the Carolines (1930)
- Crying Fist (2005)
- Crying Freeman (1996)
- The Crying Game (1992)
- Crying Ladies (2003)
- Crying and Laughing (1900)
- Crying for Love (2008)
- Crying Out (2010)
- Crying Out In Love (2016)
- Crying Out Love in the Center of the World (2004)
- Crying... Silicon Tears (2001)
- Cryptid (2022)
- Cryptids (2023)
- Crypto (2019)
- Cryptozoo (2021)
- Crystal or Ash, Fire or Wind, as Long as It's Love (1989)
- Crystal Fairy & the Magical Cactus (2013)
- Crystal Hunt (1991)

=== Ct ===
- Cthulhu (2000)
- Cthulhu (2007)
- Cthulhu Mansion (1990)
- CTRL (2024)
- Ctrl Emotion (2009)

=== Cu ===
- Cu mâinile curate (1972)
- Cu4tro (2009)

==== Cua–Cup ====
- Cuadecuc, vampir (1971)
- Cuando habla el corazón (1943)
- Cuando los hijos pecan (1952)
- Cuando los hijos regresan (2017)
- Cuando quiero llorar no lloro (1973)
- Cuando sea joven (2022)
- Cuatro balazos (1964)
- Cuatro en la frontera (1958)
- Cuatro paredes (2025)
- Cuba (1979)
- The Cuban (2019)
- Cuban Rebel Girls (1959)
- Cube series:
  - Cube (1997)
  - Cube 2: Hypercube (2002)
  - Cube Zero (2004)
- Cuckoo (2009, 2014, & 2024)
- The Cuckoo (2002)
- Cuddly Toys (2022)
- Cugine mie (1978)
- Cuidado con las colas (1964)
- Cuidado con las imitaciones (1948)
- Cuidado Con Las Mujeres (1951)
- Cuidado con lo que deseas (2020)
- Cujo (1983)
- Cul-de-sac (1966)
- Cul-de-sac (2010)
- Culion (2019)
- Culloden (1964) (TV)
- Culpa (1993)
- Culpable (1960)
- The Culpepper Cattle Co. (1972)
- Culprit (1917)
- Culprit (1937)
- Culprits (1960)
- Cult (2013)
- Cult (2026)
- Cult of the Cobra (1955)
- Cult Hero (2022)
- Cult Killer (2024)
- Cult of VHS (2022)
- Cumbadan Rumbaya (1960)
- Cumbres de hidalguía (1947)
- Cuore di mamma (1969)
- Cuore matto... matto da legare (1967)
- Cuori nella tormenta (1984)
- Cup (2024)
- The Cup: (1999 & 2011)
- Cup Bashi (2026)
- Cup of Cheer (2020)
- Cup Fever (1965)
- Cup Final (1991)
- Cupcakes (2013)
- Cupid Angling (1918)
- Cupid Camouflaged (1918)
- Cupid at the Circus (1910)
- Cupid in Clover (1929)
- Cupid the Cowpuncher (1920)
- Cupid in a Dental Parlor (1913)
- Cupid Forecloses (1919)
- Cupid Love (1995) (TV)
- Cupid One (1985)
- Cupid's Brand (1921)
- Cupid's Fireman (1923)
- Cupid's Knockout (1926)
- Cupid's Mistake (2001)
- Cupid's Rival (1917)
- Cupid's Rustler (1918)
- Cupid's Target (1915)

==== Cur–Cut ====
- Curdled (1996)
- Cure (1997)
- The Cure: (1917, 1995 & 2014)
- A Cure for Wellness (2017)
- Cured (2020)
- Curfew: (1925, 1989, 1994 & 2012)
- The Curiosity of Chance (2006)
- Curiosity Kills the Cat (2006)
- The Curious Case of Benjamin Button (2008)
- The Curious Dr. Humpp (1969)
- Curious George (2006)
- Curly Sue (1991)
- Current: (1992 & 2009)
- The Current War (2017)
- The Curse: (1924 & 1987)
- Curse II: The Bite (1989)
- Curse III: Blood Sacrifice (1990)
- The Curse of the Aztec Mummy (1957)
- The Curse of Belphegor (1967)
- Curse of the Black Widow (1977) (TV)
- The Curse of the Cat People (1944)
- Curse of the Crimson Altar (1968)
- Curse of the Demon (1958)
- Curse of the Fly (1965)
- The Curse of Frankenstein (1957)
- Curse of the Golden Flower (2007)
- The Curse of the Jade Scorpion (2001)
- The Curse of La Llorona (2019)
- The Curse of the Living Corpse (1964)
- Curse of the Pink Panther (1983)
- The Curse of Sleeping Beauty (2016)
- Curse of the Undead (1959)
- The Curse of the Werewolf (1961)
- Cursed: (2004 & 2005)
- The Cursed (2021)
- The Cursed Ones (2015)
- Curtain (1920)
- Curtains: (1983 & 1995)
- Curucu, Beast of the Amazon (1956)
- The Curve: (1998 & 2020)
- Custer of the West (1967)
- Custer's Last Fight (1912)
- Custodio de señoras (1979)
- Cut: (2000 & 2011)
- The Cut: (2007, 2014 Canadian, 2014 International, 2017 & 2024)
- Cut Throat City (2020)
- Cute Girl (1980)
- Cutie Honey (2004)
- Cutie Honey: Tears (2016)
- Cuties (2020)
- Cutter's Way (1981)
- Cutthroat Island (1995)
- Cutting Class (1989)
- The Cutting Edge (1992)
- The Cutting Edge: Fire and Ice (2010) (TV)
- The Cutting Edge: Going for the Gold (2006) (TV)
- Cutting It Short (1980)

=== Cy–Cz ===
- Cy Whittaker's Ward (1917)
- Cyanide (2006)
- Cyber Bandits (1995)
- Cyber Heist (2023)
- Cyber Seduction: His Secret Life (2005) (TV)
- Cyber Seniors (2014)
- Cyber Yugadol Nava Yuva Madhura Prema Kavyam (2012)
- Cyberbully: (2011 TV & 2015 TV)
- Cyberjack (1995)
- Cyberman (2001)
- The Cybernetic Grandma (1962)
- Cyberstalker (2012) (TV)
- CyberTracker (1994)
- CyberWorld (2000)
- Cyborg series:
  - Cyborg (1989)
  - Cyborg 2 (1993)
  - Cyborg 3: The Recycler (1994)
- Cyborg 2087 (1966)
- Cyborg Cop series:
  - Cyborg Cop (1993)
  - Cyborg Cop II (1994)
  - Cyborg Cop III (1995)
- Cyborg She (2008)
- Cyborg Soldier (2008)
- Cyborgs (2017)
- Cycle: (2008 & 2018)
- The Cycle: (1975, 2009 & 2026)
- The Cycle of Love (2025)
- The Cycle Savages (1969)
- The Cyclist (1987)
- Cyclists (2018)
- Cyclo (1995)
- Cyclomania (2001)
- Cyclone: (1978 & 1987)
- The Cyclone Cowboy (1927)
- Cyclone on Horseback (1941)
- The Cyclone Kid (1931)
- The Cyclone Kid (1942)
- Cyclone of the Range (1927)
- The Cyclone Ranger (1935)
- The Cyclone Rider (1924)
- Cyclone of the Saddle (1935)
- Cyclops: (1976, 1982, 1987 & 2008 TV)
- The Cyclops (1957)
- The Cyclotron (2016)
- Cymbeline (2014)
- Cynara: (1932 & 2023)
- The Cynic, the Rat and the Fist (1977)
- Cynics (1991)
- Cynthia (1947)
- Cypher (2002)
- Cyrano (2021)
- Cyrano de Bergerac: (1900, 1925, 1946, 1950, 1972 TV, 1990 & 2008 TV)
- Cyrus: Mind of a Serial Killer (2010)
- Cytherea (1924)
- The Czar of Black Hollywood (2014)
- The Czar of Broadway (1930)
- The Czar and the Carpenter (1956)
- The Czar's Courier (1936)
- The Czarina's Secret (1928)
- Czech Dream (2004)
- The Czech Year (1947)
- CzechMate: In Search of Jiří Menzel (2018)
- Czechoslovakia 1968 (1969)

Previous: List of films: B Next: List of films: D

== See also ==
- Lists of films
- Lists of actors
- List of film and television directors
- List of documentary films
- List of film production companies
