= Minuet in G major =

Minuet in G major can refer to numerous musical compositions, including:

- Minuet in G major, BWV Anh. 114, by Christian Petzold (previously attributed to Johann Sebastian Bach)
- Minuet in G major, BWV Anh. 116, in the second Notebook for Anna Magdalena Bach, doubtfully attributed to J. S. Bach
- Minuet WoO 10, No. 2 (Beethoven), in G major, by Ludwig van Beethoven
- Minuet in G Major, No. 4 of Five Minuets with Six Trios, D 89 for string quartet by Franz Schubert
- Minuet in G (Paderewski), Op. 14/1 by Ignacy Jan Paderewski
