= Berni Goldblat =

Swiss-Zimbabwean filmmaker and critic

Berni Goldblat is a Swiss-Zimbabwean filmmaker and critic. He has been a juror at the Africa Movie Academy Awards since 2007.

== Career ==
Born in 1970 in Stockholm, Sweden, Goldblat has been doing video productions centered around West Africa since 1999. In 2000, he founded Cinomade, a Burkinabé association that aims to increase knowledge and appreciation of digital media to film-making. By 2006, he founded his own production company, Les films du Djabadjah in Burkina Faso. He was a jury at Imagé Santé International Film Festival in 2008. In 2017, he was made head of jury for the 13th edition of the AMAA awards. In 2009, his film, Hillside Crowd won the best documentary award at Brooklyn Film Festival.

== Filmography ==
He has been directing movies since 1999.

- Burongabu mo (1999)
- Doni-doni b'an bela – Nous avons tous une part de responsabilité (2001)
- Ceux de la colline (2009)
- The Hillside Crowd (2009)
- Le duo de film (Le micro à ta portée, 2007)
- Mokili (2006)
- Love woes (2006)
- La Trilogie (Le micro à ta portée, 2005)
- Fiston du ghetto (2004)
- Tiim (2004)
