= Sympathy in Summer =

- Directed by: Antony I. Ginnane
- Written by: Antony I. Ginnane
- Produced by: Antony I. Ginnane
- Starring: Vincent Griffith; Connie Simmons; Tony Horler
- Cinematography: Nigel Buesst
- Edited by: Elliot Nugent
- Music by: Bill Hood
- Distributed by: Studio Films
- Release date: 14 March 1971
- Running time: 50 minutes
- Country: Australia
- Language: English
- Budget: A$5,000

Sympathy in Summer is a 1971 film directed by Antony I. Ginnane when he was a 19-year-old university student. It was partly financed by Melbourne University Film Society and was heavily financed by the films of Jean-Luc Godard, François Truffaut and Alain Resnais.

== Premise ==
Lenny is a young womanising university student who is not as confident as he appears. He recalls his relationship with his girlfriend Anne and imagines Carlton as a Bohemian Paris.

== Cast ==
- Connie Simmons as Anne Benton
- Vincent Griffith as Lenny Marshall
- Tony Horler as the other man
- Robin Wells as the perfect woman
- Pam McAlister as Candy
- John Caust
- Marlene Schulenberg
- Leon Boyle

== Production ==
The film was shot in 1968 but not released until 1971 by which time Ginnane had established himself as a distributor. It only received a limited release.

== Legacy ==
The film is markedly different in genre from the movies Ginnane would later make when he became a producer.

Footage from the movie appeared in the documentary Carlton + Godard = Cinema (2003).
