= The Creature Below =

- Directed by: Stewart Sparke
- Written by: Paul Butler
- Produced by: Stewart Sparke; Paul Butler
- Starring: Anna Dawson; Michaela Longden; Daniel Thrace; Johnny Vivash; Zacharee Lee; Libby Wattis; David Shackleton
- Cinematography: Cal O'Connell
- Edited by: Stewart Sparke
- Music by: Dave S. Walker
- Production company: Dark Rift Films
- Distributed by: Breaking Glass Pictures
- Release dates: 27 August 2016 (Horror Channel FrightFest); 28 February 2017 (DVD)
- Running time: 83 minutes
- Country: United Kingdom
- Language: English

The Creature Below is a 2016 British science fiction horror film directed by Stewart Sparke and written by Paul Butler, starring Anna Dawson, Michaela Longden, Daniel Thrace, Johnny Vivash, Zacharee Lee, Libby Wattis and David Shackleton.

== Cast ==
- Anna Dawson as Olive Crown
- Michaela Longden as Ellie Crown
- Daniel Thrace as Matthew Gardiner
- Johnny Vivash as Dara
- Zacharee Lee as Dr. Fletcher
- Libby Wattis as Mrs. Jones
- David Shackleton as Herbery
- Cal O'Connell as Ship Doctor
- Lyndsey Craine as Nurse

== Release ==
The film premiered at Horror Channel FrightFest on 27 August 2016.

== Reception ==
Gareth Jones of Dread Central rated the film 2.5 stars out of 5 and wrote that it "offers little by way of levity", "suffers with a corresponding lack of spark in its script" and "often feels plodding and morose". Jones criticised the CGI but praised the performances and Sparke's "ambition and skill". Kevan Farrow of Scream rated the film 2 stars out of 5 and wrote whileit "has aspirations of being an emotionally-driven character drama within a monster movie skin", the "relationships, characters and dialogue fail to convince enough to pull it off." Film critic Kim Newman praised the performances of Dawson and Longden but stated that the "men in the film more stereotyped and perfunctory".
