= A Car-Tune Portrait =

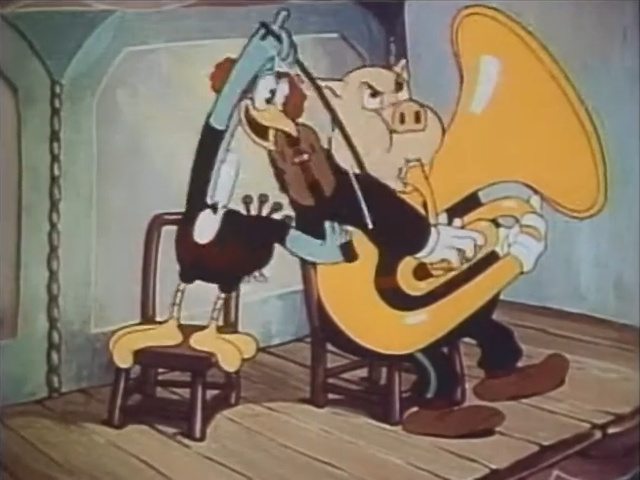
- Directed by: Direction: Dave Fleischer; Director of animation: David Tendlar
- Story by: Uncredited story by: Dave Fleischer; Isadore Sparber and David Tendlar
- Produced by: Max Fleischer
- Starring: Featuring the voice talent of: David Ross as the band leader (uncredited)
- Music by: Musical supervisor: Lou Fleischer (uncredited); Musical arrangement: King Ross
- Animation by: Character animation: David Tendlar; Nicholas Tafuri; Herman Cohen (uncr.); William Sturm (uncr.); Eli Brucker (uncr.); Joe Oriolo (uncr.); Jack Rabin (uncr.)
- Color process: Technicolor (3-strip, credited on the original issue)
- Production company: Fleischer Studios
- Distributed by: Paramount Pictures
- Release date: June 26, 1937
- Running time: 7 minutes
- Country: United States
- Language: English

A Car-Tune Portrait is a cartoon in the color Classics series produced by Fleischer Studios. Released on June 26, 1937, the cartoon gives an imaginative take on Franz Liszt's Hungarian Rhapsody No. 2.

== Plot ==
After the brief opening credits set to an orchestrated version of the Minuet in G by Ludwig van Beethoven, the cartoon introduces a lion who is dressed as a musical conductor and attempts to keep his orchestra of animal musicians in order as they half-play and half-fight their way through the piece. Memorable moments include a dachshund playing the xylophone with his back legs while the rest of him sleeps, a group of monkeys using a flute as a pea-shooter to fire at their fellow musicians, and a horse trombonist who attempts to swat a fly with his trombone, but only succeeding in hitting the dog trumpeter in front of him.

In keeping with the building frenzy of Liszt's rhapsody, the animals become more and more violent, playing pranks on each other and generally wreaking havoc, but the piece still goes on. The final scenes see the lion conductor getting smashed over the head with a giant bass drum, at which point he gives in, the music finishes, and the cartoon ends.

== Similar cartoons ==
Other cartoons with similar plots include the Oscar-nominated shorts, Rhapsody in Rivets and The Magic Fluke; an Oscar-winning short, The Cat Concerto; a Merrie Melodie short, Rhapsody Rabbit with Bugs Bunny; a Woody Woodpecker short, convict Concerto, with a story by Hugh Harman; and a Looney Tunes short, Daffy's Rhapsody.

== See also ==
- Song Car-Tunes, 1924–1927 series of cartoons produced by Fleischer Studios and released by Red Seal Pictures.
