= Cruisin' J-Town =

1975 American documentary film

Cruisin' J-Town is a 1975 American documentary film by Duane Kubo about jazz musicians in Los Angeles's Little Tokyo community.

== Summary ==
The film dives inside Hiroshima, the popular Asian American jazz fusion group, and their influences.

== Legacy ==
In 2023, Cruisin J-Town was selected for preservation in the National Film Registry by the Library of Congress for its cultural and historical importance.

== See also ==
- Culture of Japan
