= The Cut (2017 film) =

2017 film directed by Peter Wangugi Gitau

- Directed by: Peter Wangugi Gitau
- Written by: Peter Wangugi Gitau
- Produced by: Jacksin Odiaga
- Starring: Ibrahim Rashid; Halima Jatan; Onesmus Kamau; Patrick Macharia; Miriam Kinuthia
- Cinematography: Nickoh Kori; John Tumbo
- Edited by: Peter Wangugi Gitau
- Release date: 30 September 2017
- Running time: 63 minutes
- Country: Kenya
- Languages: Swahili; English

The Cut is a 2017 Kenyan film directed by Peter Wangugi Gitau. The film tackles the hard-hitting and prevalent issues of female genital mutilation and child marriage in certain Kenyan communities, framing them within a broader narrative of urban migration and the betrayal of trust. Set against the backdrop of rural Laikipia and the bustling capital of Nairobi, the plot follows siblings John and Jane as they flee their home to escape the traditional practices threatening Jane's future.

== Plot ==
The film is about a young boy who is trying to save his younger sister from an early marriage and Female Genital Mutilation in a rural community in Laikipia. Together with their uncle Sam, they flee their house and seek safety in Nairobi. But their new surroundings turn out to be far more dangerous. Jane is compelled to perform manual labor with her aunt, which results in her defilement. In exchange for cash, Uncle Sam covertly helps Jane undergo FGM, which leads to serious health issues and her hospitalization.

John is forced to spend more time on the streets with a bunch of homeless kids who cause him problems when his uncle's family wrongly accuses him of stealing. He is falsely accused of a crime, and as a result, mob justice almost kills him.

== Cast ==
- Ibrahim Rashid
- Halima Jatan
- Onesmus Kamau
- Patrick Macharia
- Miriam Kinuthia

== Production ==
A participatory approach was adopted in the development of the film. To form a foundation for the script, children from the AMREF Dagoretti Child Protection and Development Centre penned down their experiences, and those of the society around them, which inspired the script touching on topics such as the abuse of children’s rights, alcoholism, maternal health and child marriage.

== Release ==
The Cut (2017) premiered at the Silicon Valley African Film Festival in San Jose, on 30 September 2018. The film premiered in Kenya on 16 May 2018 at the 'European Film Festival' in Nairobi. 'The Cut' has also screened at the 2017 Cape Town International Film Market and Festival in Cape Town, South Africa on 13 October 2017, at the Toronto Black Film Festival in Toronto, Canada on 16 February 2018.

== Awards ==
Awarding Organization	Category	Nominee	Result
Kalasha Awards	Best Picture	The Cut	Nominated
Kalasha Awards	Best Director	Peter Wangugi Gitau	Nominated
Kalasha Awards	Best Lead Actor Film	Ibrahim Rashid	Nominated
Kalasha Awards	Best Local Language Film	The Cut	Nominated
Kalasha Awards	Best Sound	Isaac Masiga	Nominated
Kalasha Awards	Best Original Score	Kelvin Ngaira	Nominated
Kalasha Awards	Best Screenplay	Peter Wangugi Gitau	Nominated

== Accolades ==
- In 2018 at the 8th Kalasha TV & Film Awards, the film received 7 nominations in different categories, including the Best Picture Film.
- Award for Best Feature at the 2nd Africa Diaspora Cinema Festival in Florence, Italy in July 2018.
