= Carlton + Godard = Cinema =

- Directed by: Nigel Buesst
- Written by: Nigel Buesst
- Release date: 1 June 2003
- Running time: 145 minutes
- Country: Australia
- Language: English

Carlton + Godard = Cinema is a 2003 Australian documentary about the Carlton film scene of the 1960s, including the work of such directors as Giorgio Mangiamele and Brian Davies. It includes excerpts from films such as:

- Il Contratto (1953)
- The Brothers (1958)
- Ninety-Nine Percent (1963)
- Clay (1965)
- Pudding Thieves (1967)
- Brake Fluid (1969),
- The Girlfriends (1967)
- Hey Al Baby (1969)
- Nothing Like Experience (1970)
- Sympathy in Summer (1970)
- Yackety Yack (1974)

It features interviews from filmmakers such as Antony I. Ginnane.
