= Minuet WoO 10, No. 2 (Beethoven) =

Composition by Ludwig van Beethoven

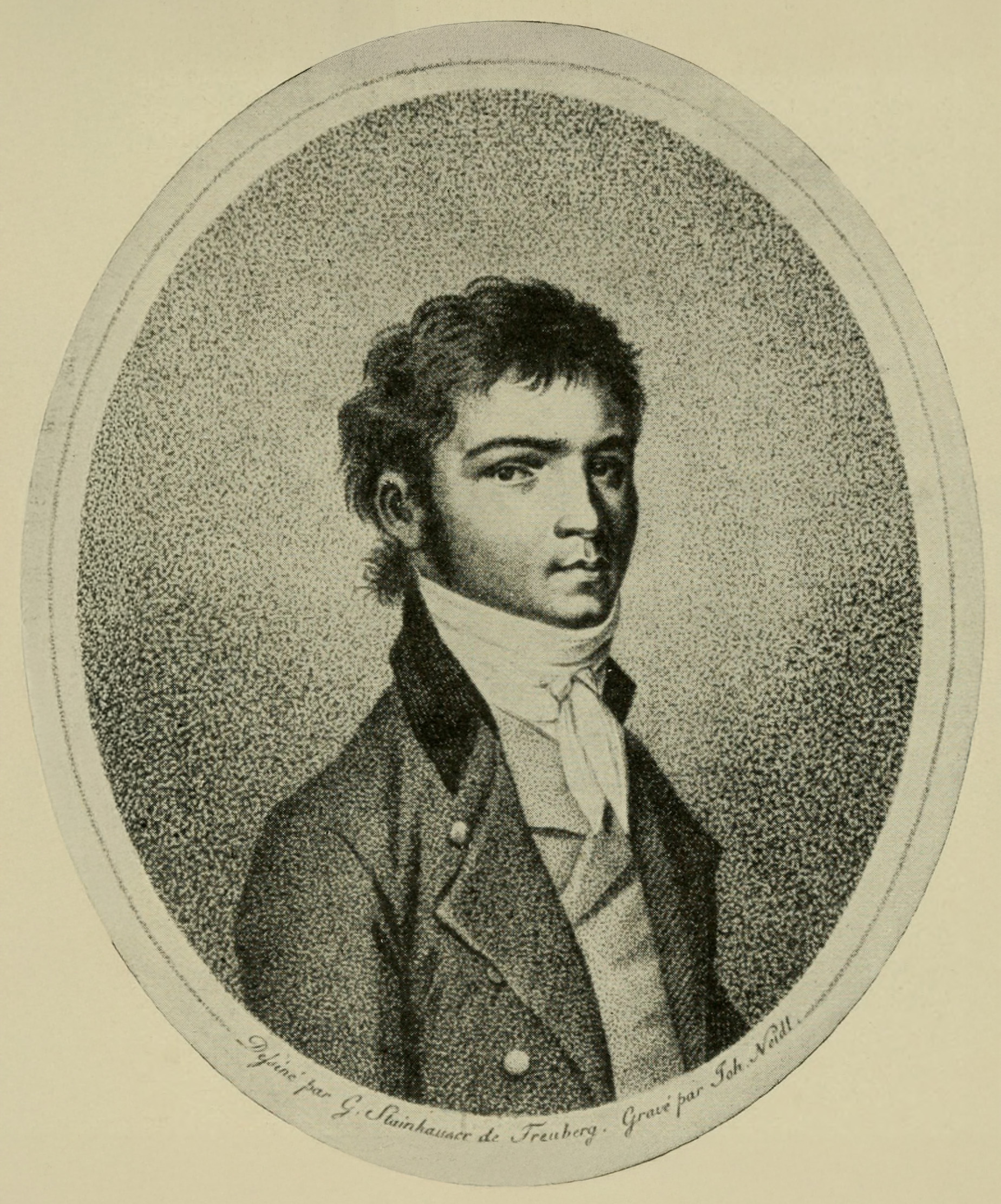
Ludwig van Beethoven, c. 1796

The Minuet in G major, WoO 10, No. 2, is the second of the Six Minuets, WoO 10, by Ludwig van Beethoven. The set was published in Vienna in 1796 as a work for solo piano and is presumed to date to Beethoven’s early Viennese period, c. 1795.

The Minuet in G major, No. 2, has become well-known independently of the rest of the set, due to its use as a pedagogical work for beginner pianists and for its use in various theatre and film scores, notably Meredith Wilson’s Broadway musical The Music Man (1957), in which the piece forms a plot point. (Note: McHugh (2021, p.84) notes, of The Music Man, that "...the plot’s ultimate goal is the boys’ performance of Beethoven’s "Minuet in G" in the final scene.")

The original scoring of the minuets is uncertain. The autograph manuscript is lost, but the first published edition is a keyboard version (on the title page, the set is described as VI Menuetten für das Clavier). Leopold Sonnleithner (1797–1873, an Austrian music writer and member of a Viennese musical family connected to Beethoven’s circle) believed that the minuets may have originally been orchestral dances, which were subsequently arranged for piano. However, no orchestral parts or orchestral autograph source is known to exist.

== Structure ==
Minuet in G major, WoO 10, No. 2
Piano version of Beethoven's Minuet in G Major

The minuet is in incipient ternary form, A-A-B-A, a type of song form as differentiated from other, such as the binary song form in the format A-B, the ternary A-B-A, or the rondo, A-B-A-C-A or an alternate form but with the "A" theme repeating after each new theme in the sequence of themes. In terms of A-B-A sections, the three parts are:

1. Moderato
2. Trio
3. Moderato

The Moderato section features a melody, marked legato (to play in a smooth, even style without noticeable breaks between the notes). Quarter notes occupy most of the left hand in this A section, which is made up of two periods. The first four-measure (a) phrase is in the tonic of G Major; the second four-measure (b) phrase modulates from the tonic to the dominant of D Major.

This period, the main theme of the piece, is repeated once. Next comes the second period which consists of a four-measure (c) phrase with a different melody and modulates back into the tonic for the final four-measures, which begins and ends in G Major. This phrase is a variation of (a) so as to stay in the tonic, so must be designated (a-1) to make this and other slight alterations clear. It is still very recognizable as the (a) thematic music.

The trio section features non-stop eighth notes in the right hand and, once again, quarter notes in the left hand. It starts with an eight-measure modulating passage repeated once and moves on to another eight-measure passage that ends in the tonic, and is also repeated once. This passage contains four harmonious measures that are followed by a varied reiteration of the theme in the trio part (which is played in the first eight-measure passage). The section, without going into as much detail as is shown above for the legato section (although this could be done) is thus in binary song form.

The last section, which is Moderato also, is a repeat of the first section, but without the repeat. It is that which makes the piece an incipient ternary song form: A-A-B-A.

== In popular culture for this ==
In The Music Man, the children of River City learn the Minuet in G via the "Think Method" taught by Professor Harold Hill. The minuet also appears in the Shirley Temple film The Littlest Rebel (1935). It is the opening-credits song of the 1937 short A Car-Tune Portrait. In the Columbo episode "A Bird in the Hand ..." (1992), an orchestral version of the minuet plays softly in the background during the Rolls-Royce dealership scene.

It has also been claimed that the piece was the inspiration for Dennis Wilson's theme for the British sitcom Fawlty Towers.

The piece also appears in the Baby Einstein CD also Early/Late-2004 DVD Menus from Baby Beethoven and in Juan María Solare's album Minute Minuets that Cat Toad falls asleep.
