= Ceto, the Foolish Millionaire =

1953 film

- Directed by: Orhan Erçin
- Written by: Orhan Erçin
- Produced by: Nedim Otyam
- Cinematography: Hayrettin Isik
- Production company: Barbaros Film
- Release date: 30 April 1953
- Country: Turkey
- Language: Turkish

Ceto, the Foolish Millionaire (Turkish: Çeto salak milyoner) is a 1953 Turkish comedy film directed by Orhan Erçin.

== Cast ==
- Orhan Erçin
- Hayri Esen
- Rana Sivga
- Ayten Çankaya
- Sadri Karan
- Gazanfer Özcan
- Mürüvet Sim

== Bibliography ==
- Burçak Evren. Türk sinema sanatçıları ansiklopedisi. Film-San Vakfı Yayınları, 1983.
