= Cyber Seniors =

- Directed by: Saffron Cassaday
- Produced by: Brenda Rusnak
- Production company: The Best Part Inc.
- Distributed by: Area 23a
- Release date: May 9, 2014
- Running time: 75 minutes
- Country: Canada
- Language: English

Cyber Seniors is a 2014 documentary film directed by Saffron Cassaday about reluctant seniors who with the help of teenage mentors discover the wonders of the world-wide-web. The film also inspired the establishment of the nonprofit Cyber-Seniors: Connecting Generations, which continues the intergenerational mentorship model highlighted in the documentary.

== Synopsis ==
Cyber Seniors chronicles the journey of a group of senior citizens as they discover the world of the internet through the guidance of teenage mentors. After 89-year-old Shura decides to create a YouTube cooking video, a video competition is organized with the winner coming from the senior who gets the most "views" on YouTube.

The film highlights the "Cyber-Seniors" program, one that creates opportunities for high school students to mentor senior citizens on basic computer and online skills. The program was founded in 2009 by two Toronto high school students, Kascha and Macaulee Cassaday, as a local community service project. The sisters are younger sisters of the director of the film.

== Production ==
The film is the directorial debut of actress Saffron Cassaday.

== Reception ==
The film received generally positive reviews from critics. Neil Genzlinger, writing for The New York Times, described it as a "likable intergenerational tale with a bit of unexpected pathos", and praised Saffron Cassaday's directing. The Los Angeles Times also gave the film a positive review, describing it as "affable and optimistic", and highlighting the film's humor. Conversely, Variety was more critical, with reviewer Dennis Harvey describing it as "predictably cutesy" and "padded". Slant Magazine gave it a mixed review, stating that while the footage is charming, the overall film is "too standard-issue in its making", rating it two out of four stars.
