= The Camp (film) =

2013 film by Tamer Eissa

The Camp Arabic: المخيم
- Film poster
- Directed by: Tamer Eissa
- Written by: Tamer Eissa
- Starring: Siraj; Rizk; Shahd
- Cinematography: Tamer Eissa
- Edited by: Hagar Hamdy
- Music by: Mohamed Abo Zekry
- Distributed by: Porttawfik Film
- Release date: April 1, 2013 (Cairo, Egypt)
- Running time: 54 minutes
- Country: Egypt
- Language: Arabic with English Subtitles

The Camp (Arabic: المخيم) is a 2013 Arabic language documentary film by Egyptian photographer, filmmaker and director Tamer Eissa, about the "Arab Spring Camp" attended by children of martyrs who fell in Gaza and children of martyrs of the Egyptian revolution. The children's camp took place in July 2012 for 2 weeks in two locations: in Cairo and in Nuebaa by the Red Sea. Through interviews of the organizers and of the children, and by following their activities in the camp, the documentary depicts the experience of the children in the camp during the two weeks, focusing on the personal stories of three of the children: Siraj, Rizk and Shahd. The film first screened in Cairo on April 1, 2013.

== Synopsis ==
The Camp is a 2-week holiday camp for children of the martyrs from Gaza and Egypt. The activities in the Camp were meant to provide psychological support to the children of martyrs to help them in the acceptance of the loss of their parents. The activities involved expression through arts (visual and music), psycho-drama sessions, outdoor activities, etc. The group of volunteers included professionals from the field of education, psychology and arts. The intention of the camp organizers was to include children from other Arab Spring countries however due to budget constraints it was restricted to children from Gaza and Egypt. The psychological support to the children was influenced by the Montessori educational approach.

== Production ==
Film director Tamer Eissa initially joined the camp as a volunteer to teach the children photography, video making and filming. After returning from the camp, he decided to make the film to document the experience.

Director's note: "The Camp … you may consider it a film and maybe not…. You may consider it a short trip After taking this trip I asked myself … what is pleasure? Before trying to explain the answer I have reached…. Let me tell you the story from the beginning.

In June 2012, I traveled to the Egyptian city of Nuwebi'. I was part of the team of "The Arab Spring Camp for Children", for 11 days. My initial plan for joining the Camp was to organize a workshop to teach the children Photography and Video Filming.

But without any previous preparations I found myself dragged into a flood of memories, stories and meditations; and soon the positive energy I had arrived with.... changed my intentions to an attempt to document some of the details of the trip and to narrate part of the children's stories. I loved those children and learnt a great deal from them. Their strength helped me to regain a positive energy and determination to love life, a concept I had almost lost in our world.

The Camp was over and I returned to crowded Cairo, carrying with me lovely memories of the trip, not knowing what to do with all the photographed material I brought back with me... few months later this film was made with the help of a dedicated team in the editing room. Thanks to the children of the camp, who made their own film on their own. I think this is pleasure”

=== Soundtrack ===
The soundtrack of the movie is extracted from the 2013 album "CHAOS" by Mohamed Abozekry and Heejaz.
