= Cannibal Rollerbabes =

- DVD cover
- Directed by: Kalman Szegvary
- Written by: Jason Wolthuizen
- Produced by: Kalman Szegvary; Malak Tabbara
- Starring: John Sorbera; Mark Tyler; Amy Van Elle; Paul Noiles; Lisa Heughan
- Music by: Teddy Szegvary
- Distributed by: Wildfire Motion Picture Company
- Release date: 1997
- Running time: 90 minutes
- Country: Canada
- Language: English

Cannibal Rollerbabes is a 1997 no-budget Canadian horror film about cannibalism, directed by Kalman Szegvary. It is set in Los Angeles, although it was filmed in Ontario.

== Plot ==
When Scott is fired from Local Diner because he assaulted a patron (Billy Waters, who razzed him about getting on the force first), Scott decides to visit his friend Chuck at the radio station. Scott and Chuck wanted a quiet weekend of fishing at Chuck's father's remote summer cabin, but when Scott reels in a note bearing the ominous message "People Eating People," their weekend in the sun takes a dark turn. They meet two girls who are on the side of the road, but decide not to give them a ride, believing that they have a whole week ahead of them to find other girls.

Later that evening, while fishing, Scott has visions of a girl named Anna. The next day while Scott and Chuck are fishing, Scott sees an old castle on an island. Chuck explains the castle is an abandoned laboratory. However, the laboratory is not abandoned, but a home to the scientist who goes by the name of Atman. Under Atman's control are a group of women on rollerblades he likes to call "Rollerbabes", led by his main servant, "Spike". Contrary to what the name would suggest, these cannibals do not in fact rollerblade. He sends Spike out using a radio control device to gather men for his "Rollerbabes" to eat to help preserve their beauty. Anna, finds herself drawn towards Scott and tries unsuccessfully to escape the island.

Scott and Chuck go rollerblading however they are not alone. The boys are split up. Chuck is knocked out by two of the Rollerbabes and taken back to the castle. Scott is targeted by Atman himself, who attempts to attack him with a machete but misses him. Scott knows he is being surrounded and flees. When he manages to escape, he discovers the town's sheriff dragging partially devoured human flesh from the river, causing him to realise he must rescue Chuck from the castle. When Scott arrives on the island, he meets an elf named Random, who helps him hide from the Centurions that guard the island. While trying to enter the castle, the Rollerbabes catch him. Once in the castle, Scott finds that he is too late to save Chuck. He then must escape by confronting Atman himself.

== Cast ==
- John Sorbera as Scott Freeman
- Mark Tyler as Chuck Webster
- Amy Van Elle as Princess Anna
- Paul Noiles as Atman/Mayor Caplan and assistant director
- Lisa Heughan as Spike
- Nicole Ages as Bumper
- Paul Griffin as Sheriff Codwell

== Production ==
Production Cannibal Rollerbabes was written by Kalman Szegvary and Jason Wolthuizen who is a writer and actor also known for Solid Cover (2000) and Shadow Creature (1995) Cannibal Rollerbabes was filmed in Peterborough and Lakefield, Ontario. Director Kalman Szegvary was born in Peterborough, Ontario, and it is where his passion for filmmaking began when he was eight-years-old. Szegvary is currently an instructor of film and television production at the Trebas Institute The production company of the film is Wildfire Motion Picture Company, a Toronto based film company of which Szegvary is the president and CEO.

The film was shot on grainy film to create the horror film feeling.

Once the movie was completed, distributors claimed the final edit did not contain enough nudity. The director then found it difficult to get and solidify a distribution contract. The film has since become a hit in cult film circles. Howard Stern discussed it one morning on his radio phone-in show when Lisa Heughan, cast member of Cannibal Rollerbabes, made a guest appearance.

== Cultural Representation ==
Being a Canadian film, Canadian culture is represented throughout. During the movie, the phrase "up north to cottage country," a distinctly Canadian expression and concept is used. Furthermore, during the credits, animated maple leaves can be seen. Product placement is used throughout the film including characters drinking beers by Labatt Brewing Company a Canadian alcohol staple.

== Soundtrack ==
The movies' theme song was "People Eating People" performed by Cadillac Bill & The Creeping Bent (with Christine Leakey on vocals). Recorded at Signal to Noise Studios in 1997 with music by Bill Boyd-Wilson. The director's brother, Teddy Szegvary, was the film's location sound supervisor.

== Distribution ==
The movie suffered distribution problems upon its release. Due to high circulation and demand of bootleg copies of the film, it was finally released on DVD by the director himself rather than through the production company. The DVD contains special features such as director's commentary and a "Making Of" documentary. The film is currently available on iTunes for rent or for purchase.
