= Frances Ne Moyer =

American actress (1896–1981)

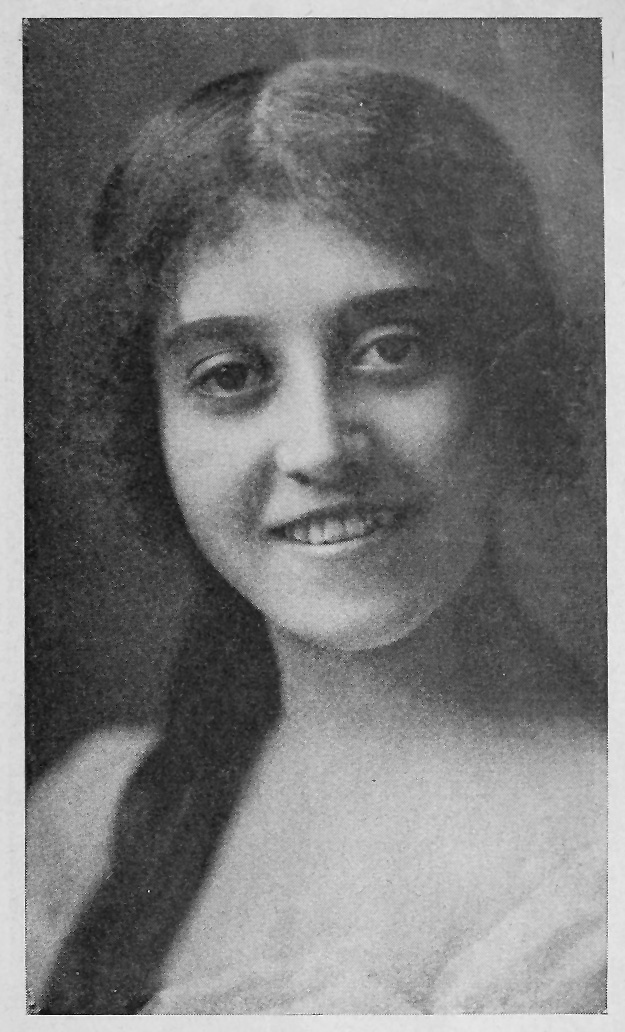
- Born: September 29, 1896; Westfield, New York, United States
- Died: December 1981 (aged 85); North Salem, New York, U.S.
- Other name: Frances McCruden
- Known for: Silent film actress

Frances E. Ne Moyer McCruden (September 28, 1896 – December 1981) was an actress who appeared in almost a hundred silent comedy films between 1913 and 1919. Her surname is sometimes found as NeMoyer, Ne-Moyer, or Nemoyer.

== Early life and education ==
Ne Moyer was born in Westfield, New York, the daughter of Henry W. NeMoyer and Mary Jane Harrington NeMoyer. She attended Miss Nardin's Academy in Buffalo, New York. Her family was in show business and she performed with the Anson Gilmore Stock Company. She also played piano.

== Career ==
Beginning in her teens, Ne Moyer appeared in films for Lubin Studio and the Kalem Company. A reporter noted her among performers supporting Mae Hotely at Lubin, describing her as "the girl with the beautiful eyes". She fell about 30 feet from a cliff for a scene in The Smuggler's Daughter (1914), barely escaping injury. She worked with noted vamp Theda Bara in Gold and the Woman (1916); later, Ne Moyer played a vamp character in The Law of Nature (1919), her last film.

Her sister Marguerite Ne Moyer was also a film actress; they were both members of the Lubin company working with director Arthur Hotaling, and appeared in several comedies together, including The Rest Cure (1913), She Must Be Ugly (1913), All Account of Daisy (1914), and His Sudden Recovery (1914). She also worked several times with Oliver Hardy.

== Later years ==
Ne Moyer married investment executive Donald Breslin McCruden in 1919, in Manhattan, and made no further films. She was active in Waccabuc Country Club activities in the 1940s. Her husband died in 1961, and she died in 1981, in her eighties, in North Salem, New York.

== Filmography ==
- The Female Detective (1913)
- The Rest Cure (1913)
- She Must Be Ugly (1913)
- Training a Tightwad (1913)
- The Particular Cowboys (1913) as Muriel, the cook
- Summer Love (1914)
- A Tango Tragedy (1914)
- His Sudden Recovery (1914) as the Jones's daughter
- A Tango Tragedy (1914) as Nora Muldoon
- Outwitting Dad (1914) as Lena Gross
- Pins Are Lucky (1914) as Ruth Singleton
- Dobs at the Shore (1914) as Helen
- Cannibal King (1915) as Grace
- The Prize Baby (1915) as Florence
- Shoddy the Tailor (1915) as Minnie
- The Smuggler's Daughter (1914), in the title role
- Safety Worst (1915) as Jane Hudson
- Mixed Flats (1915) as Mrs. Robbins
- Percival's Awakening (1915)
- Her Choice (1915)
- The Wayville Slumber Party (1915)
- Mr. Stub's Pen (1915)
- Gus and the Anarchists (1915)
- Cupid's Target (1915) as Lucy
- The Servant Girl's Legacy (1914) as Bess
- What a Cinch (1915) as Molly Mason
- A Lucky Strike (1915) as Elinor, Nelle Crehan's niece
- The Dead Letter (1915) as Lena Pula
- Who Stole the Doggies? (1915) as Maggie, the Cook
- Gold and the Woman (1916) as Murray's daughter
- Peaches and Ponies (1916)
- The Law of Nature (1919) as Gene Moore
- Lover's Signal
- Won at High Tide as Sally
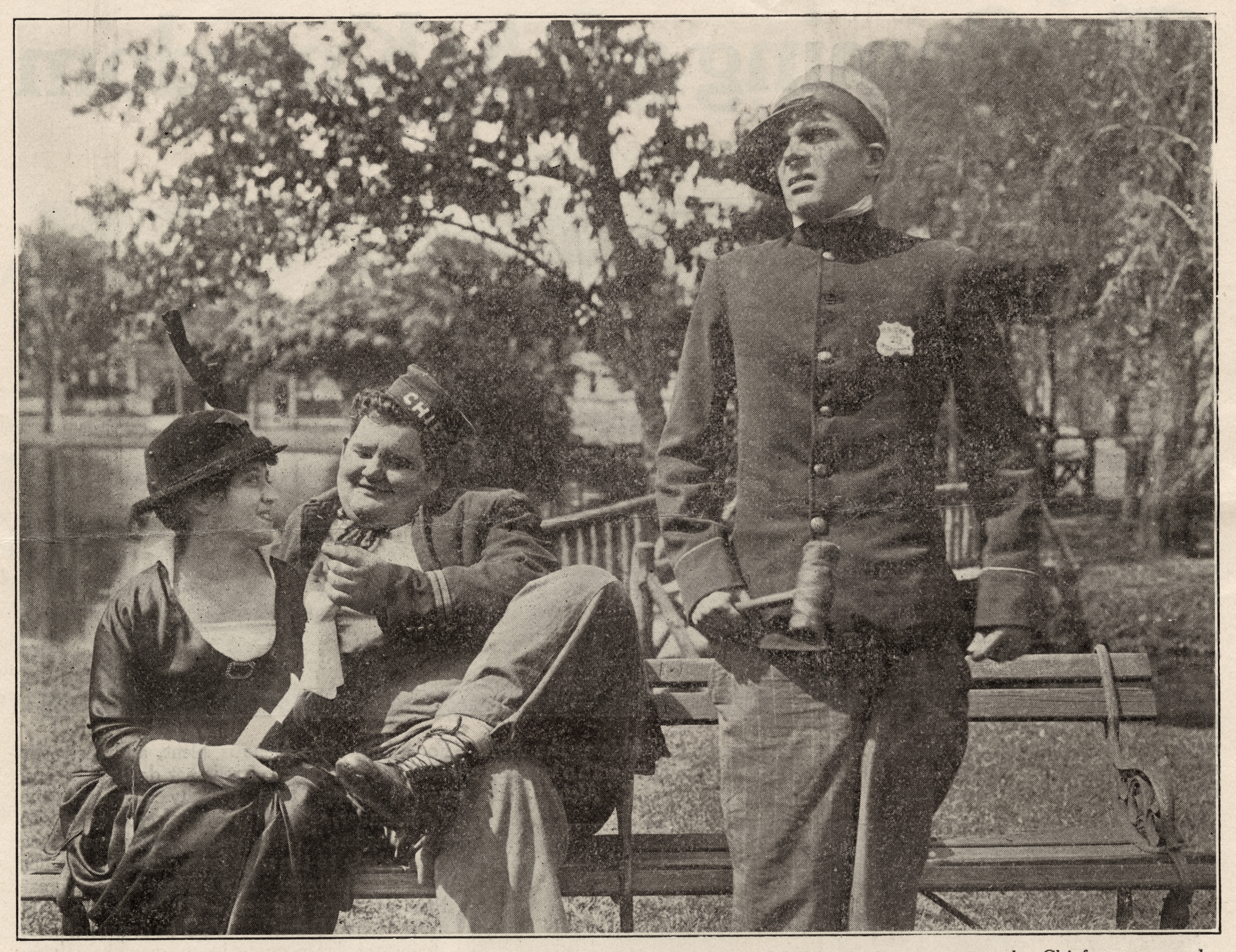
At left in What a Cinch (1915), with Oliver Hardy

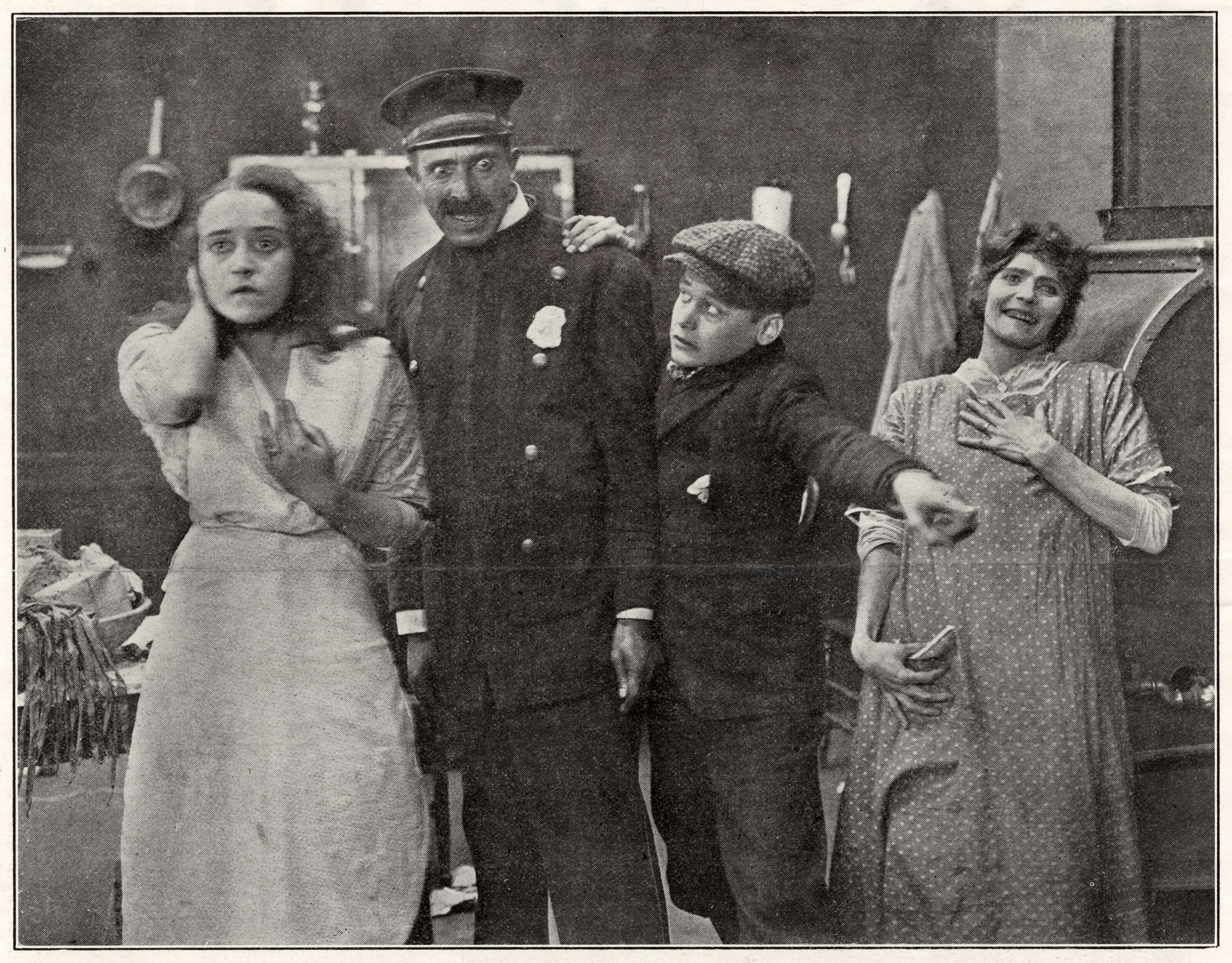
At left in Who Stole the Doggies? (1915)

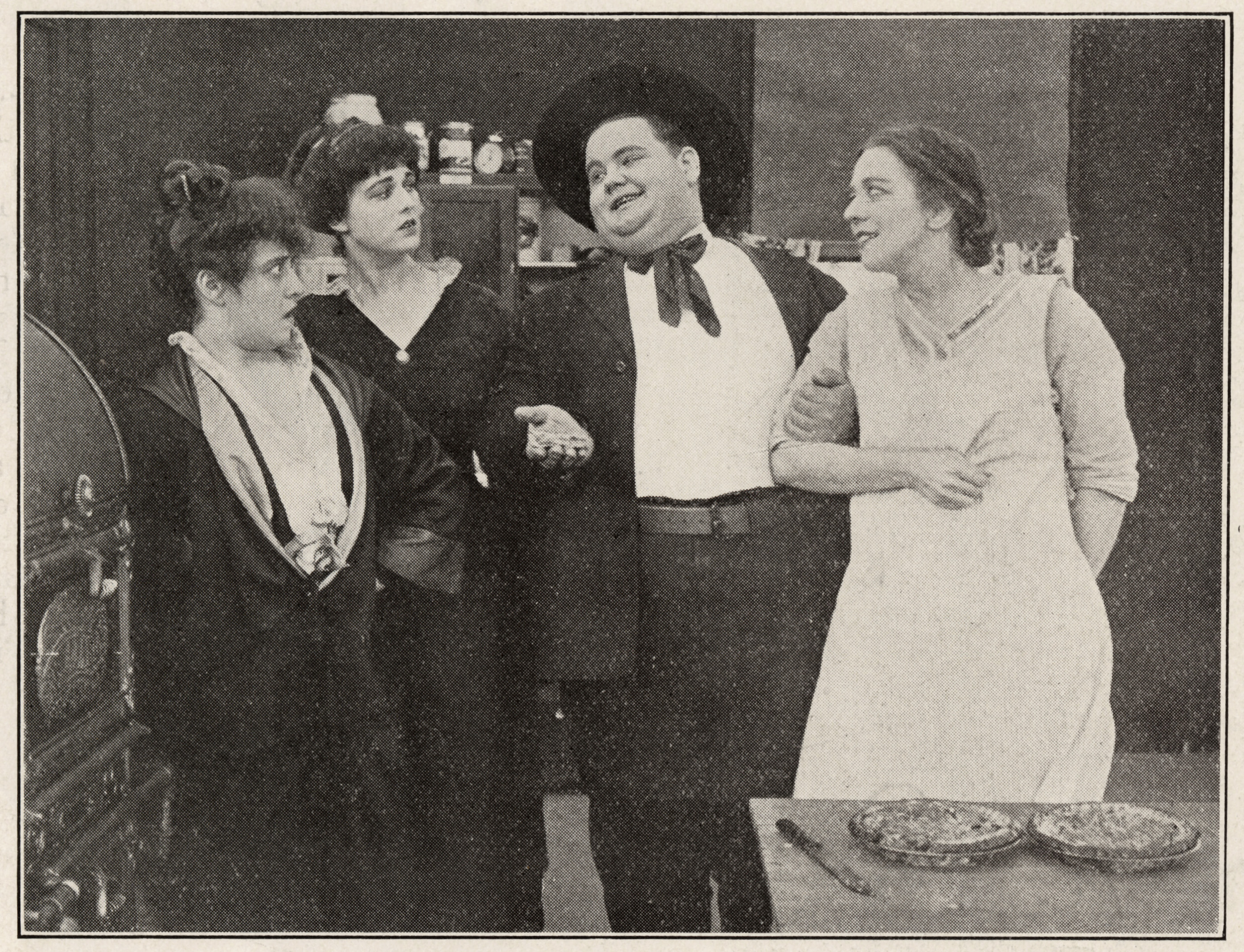
At left in A Lucky Strike (1915), with Oliver Hardy, Cora Walker and Mae Hotely

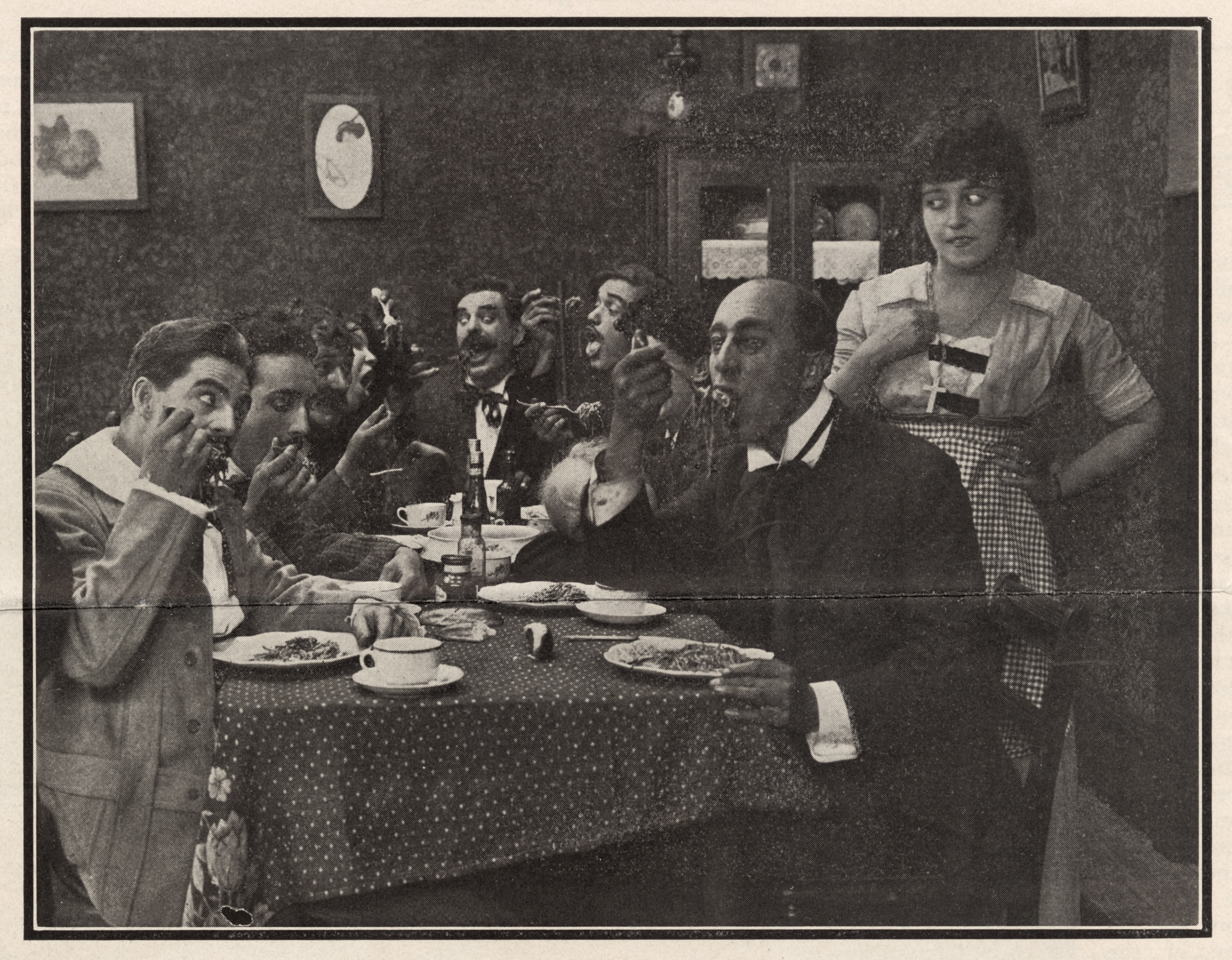
At right in The Dead Letter (1915)
