= Who Stole the Doggies? =

1915 film

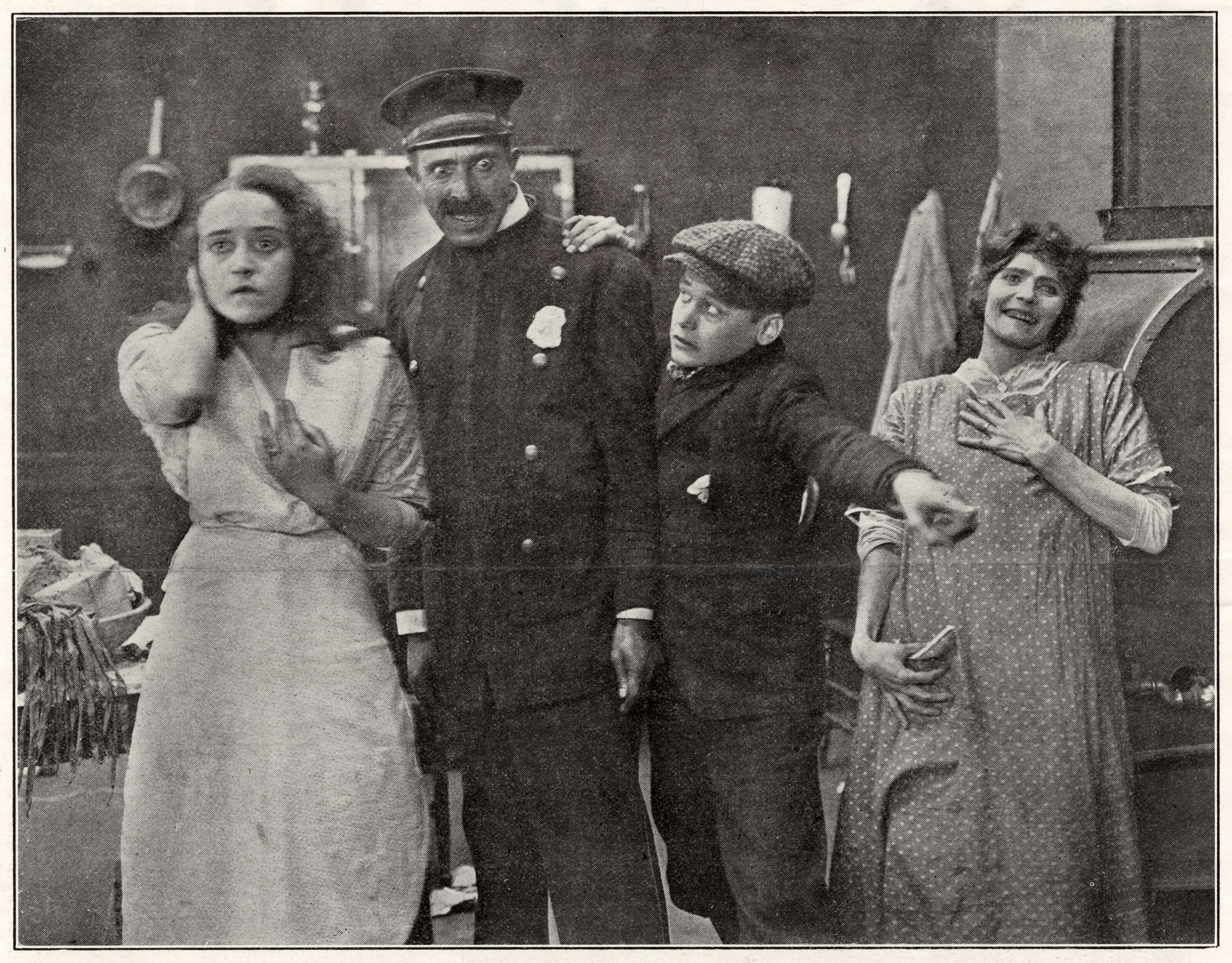
- Publicity still
- Written by: Edwin R. Coffin
- Produced by: Arthur Hotaling
- Starring: Frances Ne Moyer
- Release date: 11 May 1915
- Running time: About 10 minutes
- Country: United States
- Languages: Silent film English intertitles

Who Stole the Doggies? is a 1915 American lost silent comedy film featuring Oliver Hardy.

== Plot ==
This plot summary was published in The Moving Picture World for May 8, 1915:

Maggie, a cook, is courted by Murphy, a cop, and also receives attention from Hogan, the chief. She favors Murphy, which makes Hogan insanely jealous. One night the Rockerbilts give a party, but the function is marred by the discovery that the Wienerwursts have been stolen. The police are notified and Hogan forthwith instructs his men to look out for the thief. Murphy is on the job and casually visiting Maggie, he sees her with a string of delicacies and though he loves Maggie, his duty compels him to arrest her. Hogan, seeing Murphy making for Maggie's kitchen, follows and finds Murphy with the wieners in his hand and arrests him. Presently the Rockerbilt's cook appears and exhibits another string of sausages which she had found the house dog chewing. The populace are aroused and they propose to hang Murphy. Maggie receives the wursts and escapes. The only rope available to hang Murphy is found to be too short and while the mob are hunting a better rope Maggie rushes up and explains matters. Murphy is released and the rope is transferred to Hogan, who is left dangling by his feet.

== Cast ==
- Frances Ne Moyer as Maggie, the Cook
- Oliver Hardy as Murphy, the Cop
- Harry Lorraine as Hogan, the Police Chief

== See also ==
- List of American films of 1915
- Oliver Hardy filmography
