= Building a Fire =

1914 film

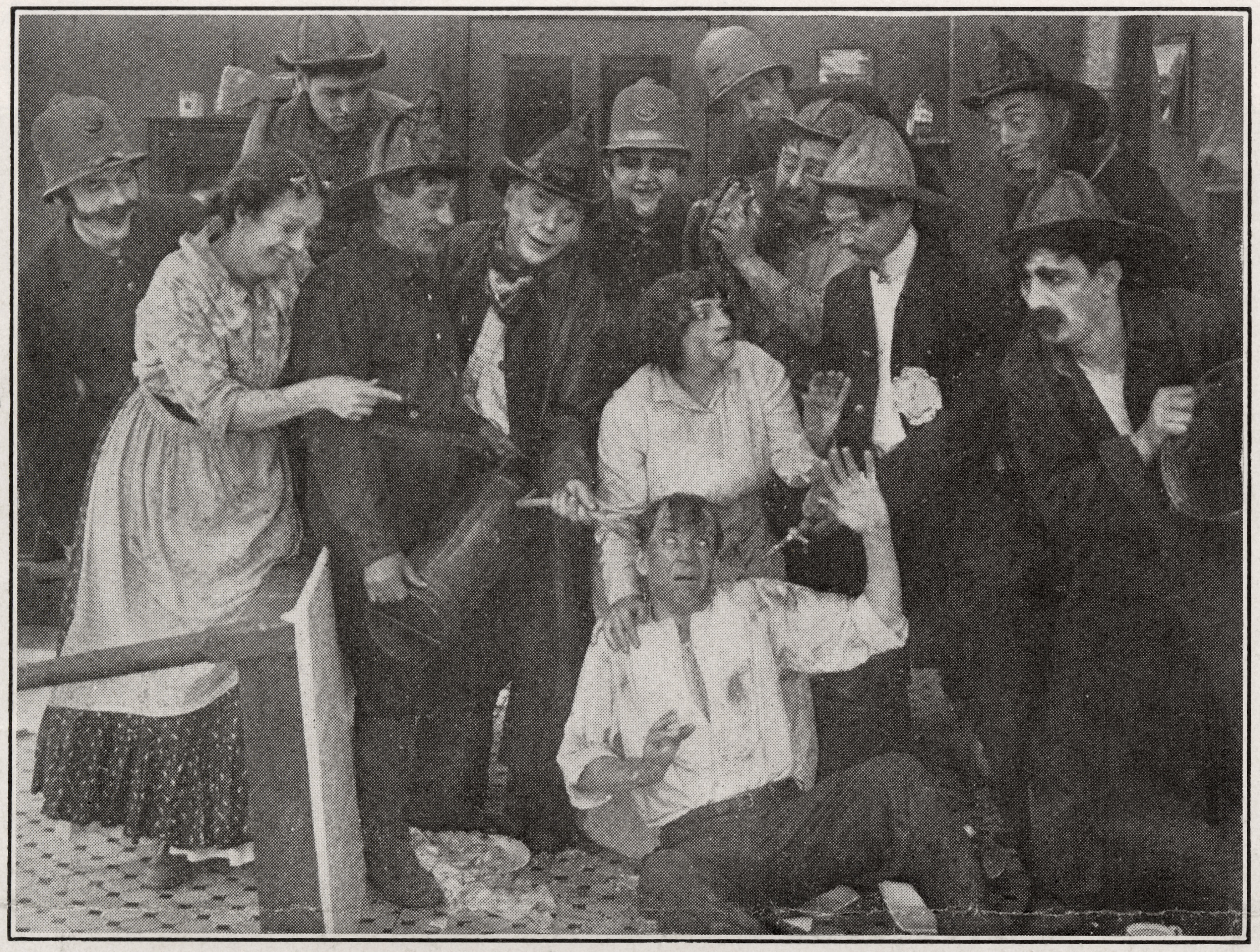
- Publicity still with the cast of Building a Fire
- Written by: Epes W. Sargent
- Produced by: Arthur Hotaling
- Starring: Mae Hotely; Julia Calhoun; Jerold T. Hevener; Oliver Hardy
- Release date: May 9, 1914
- Running time: ca. 5–6 minutes (400 feet)
- Country: United States
- Languages: Silent film English intertitles

Building a Fire is a lost 1914 American silent comedy film produced by the Lubin Manufacturing Company and starring Mae Hotely, Julia Calhoun, and Jerold Hevener. Also among the cast is Oliver Hardy, who has a small role as a policeman.

== Plot ==
The following plot summary was published in The Lubin Bulletin, the newsletter in which the studio advertised its new releases:

Maggie, the cook in the Jones family, likes to sleep late. She kills the alarm clock for disturbing her sleep and when Mrs. Jones comes to her room to find out why she does not get up, fakes it by telling her she is sick. Mr. Jones has a very important appointment and has to catch the eight o'clock train. As Maggie is still in bed he undertakes to build the fire himself and causes an explosion, by using kerosene. Maggie at last appears only to pour more oil on the fire. The Jones are sure she is going to set the place afire and rush out to inform the police and fire departments. When the firemen appear the kitchen is in perfect order and there is a nicely set breakfast. The firemen in their wrath angrily turn the fire extinguishers on to the Jones and the end is quite a decided rough house.

== Cast ==
- Mae Hotely as Maggie
- Julia Calhoun as Mrs. Jones
- Jerold T. Hevener as Mr. Jones
- Oliver Hardy as a policeman (uncredited)

== Production and reception ==
Building a Fire was filmed in Jacksonville, Florida, at the Jacksonville unit of the Lubin Manufacturing Company, under the supervision of Arthur Hotaling. It was a short split-reel comedy, lasting approximately 5–6 minutes and sharing a single reel of film with a second, unrelated comedy, With the Burglar's Help, featuring James Hodges, Kate Millius, Frank Griffin, and Harry Rice. The films were released by the General Film Company on May 9, 1914.

Building a Fire included one of the earliest known screen appearances of Oliver Hardy. Although the film itself does not survive, and he is not mentioned in any advertisements or reviews, Hardy can be seen, dressed as a cop, among the extras in the background of a publicity still reproduced in The Lubin Bulletin.

The film was not well received by the trade papers. Moving Picture World described it as a "senseless 'comedy' which is likely to fail where average audiences are encountered"; and The New York Dramatic Mirror wrote "Just to show you on how trivial an incident a photoplay may be built, this half reel comedy is built about practically no material at all. The interest is also very slight."

== See also ==
- List of American films of 1914
- Oliver Hardy filmography
