= Mixed Flats =

1915 film

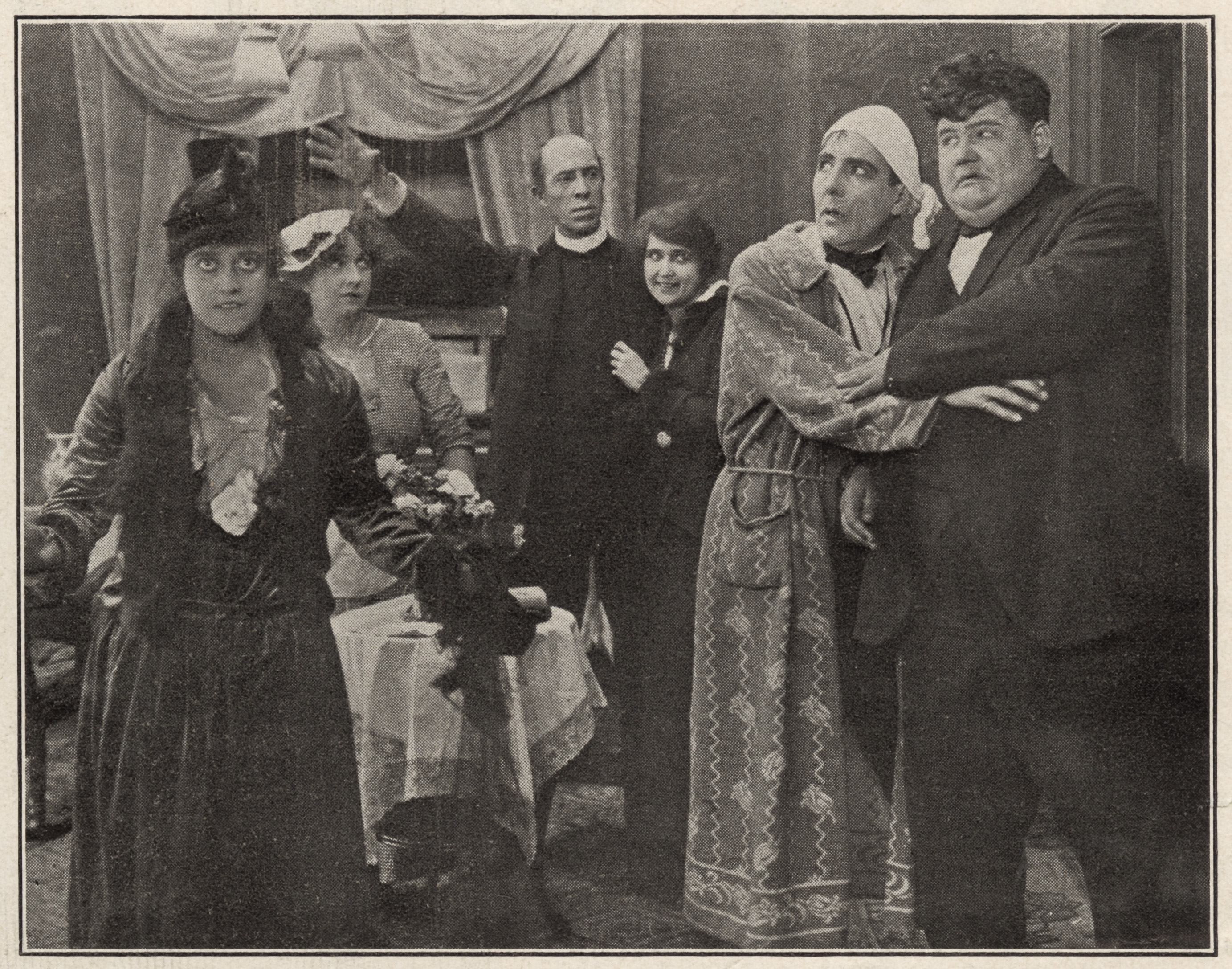
- Ben Walker and Oliver Hardy (right) in a publicity still from Mixed Flats
- Directed by: Will Louis (aka:Willard Louis)
- Written by: Will Louis
- Produced by: Arthur Hotaling
- Starring: Ben Walker
- Production company: Lubin Manufacturing Company
- Distributed by: General Film Company
- Release date: April 20, 1915
- Country: United States
- Languages: Silent film English intertitles

Mixed Flats is a 1915 American silent short comedy film featuring Oliver Hardy.

== Plot ==
According to a film magazine, "Jack and Bob, pals, have been out for a good time. Jack gets word that his wife is returning home from her vacation. He engages a servant who is, of course, a stranger to her. Minister Blake rents a new apartment in the same house with Jack. He writes his wife, who is also on her vacation, to come home at once and make no mistake, but to come to their new home at 222 Lemon street. Mrs. Blake is the first to arrive home. It being strange to her, she gets into the wrong apartment. Jack is told by the servant of his wife's return. When he discovers the mistake, he tries with Bob's aid to get rid of the strange woman before his wife returns, but they fail. When the wife arrives and accuses her husband of duplicity, they cause such a racket that the minister upstairs becomes so alarmed that he starts to investigate and discovers his wife. She explains to her husband, who apologizes and all is forgiven."

== Cast ==
- Ben Walker as Jack Robbins
- Oliver Hardy as Bob White
- Frances Ne Moyer as Mrs. Robbins
- Mabel Paige as Slavey
- Nellie Farron as Mrs. Blake
- Ed Lawrence as Minister Blake
- William H. Hopkins as A Janitor

== Production ==
- Director: Will Louis
- Producer: Arthur Hotaling
- Release date: April 20, 1915
- Country: United States
- Language: Silent (English intertitles)
- Format: Black-and-white

== Significance ==
- Mixed Flats* is notable for featuring Oliver Hardy in an early role before he became famous as part of the comedy duo Laurel and Hardy. The film represents a classic example of early American silent short comedy.

== See also ==
- List of American films of 1915
- Oliver Hardy filmography
