= The Female Cop =

1914 film

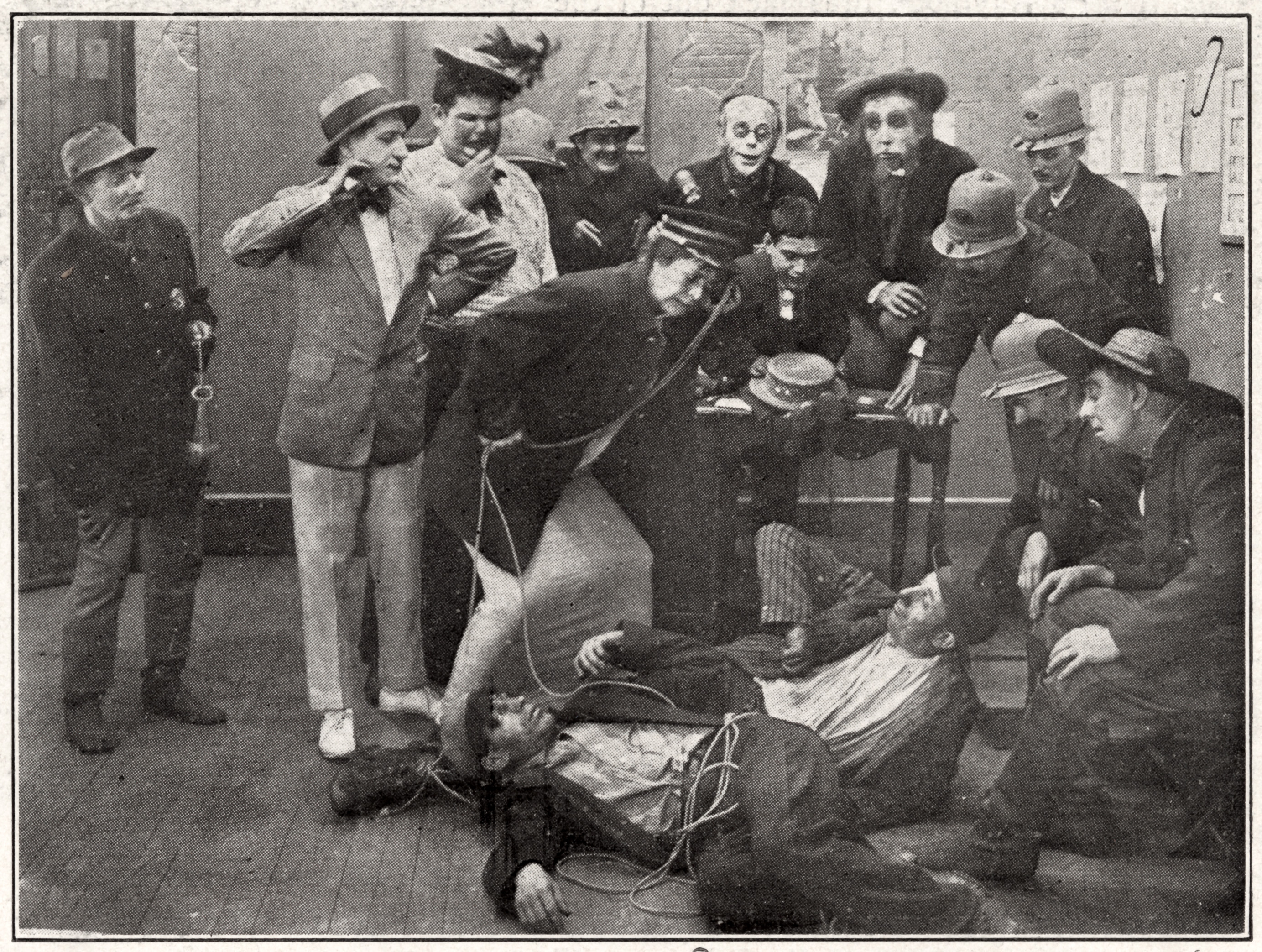
- Mae Hotely and the cast in a publicity still from The Female Cop
- Directed by: Jerold T. Hevener
- Written by: Epes W. Sargent
- Produced by: Arthur Hotaling
- Starring: Mae Hotely
- Release date: June 6, 1914
- Running time: 7–8 minutes (c. 600 feet)
- Country: United States
- Languages: Silent film English intertitles

The Female Cop is a lost 1914 American silent comedy film produced by the Lubin Manufacturing Company and starring Mae Hotely and Julia Calhoun, with Oliver Hardy as a "boob cop".

== Plot ==
Myra is an old maid who thinks that men are trying to flirt with her when they are in fact making fun of her. Her suffragette friend suggests that Myra apply to join the police force, and together they persuade the chief to give her a badge. Myra tricks another cop out of his hat and coat, and then walks her beat, arresting everyone she meets. When the cases come before the judge, the only charge Myra can make against the prisoners is that they flirted with her. The judge cannot believe this and Myra is thrown out of the courthouse. The prisoners shower her with vegetables and the film ends as Myra fights with her friend for suggesting the idea in the first place.

== Cast ==
- Mae Hotely as Myra McGinnis
- Julia Calhoun as Mrs. Brown
- Oliver Hardy as Boob Cop

== Production and reception ==
The Female Cop was filmed in Jacksonville, Florida, at the Jacksonville unit of the Lubin Manufacturing Company, under the supervision of Arthur Hotaling. It was a short split-reel comedy, lasting approximately 7–8 minutes, and sharing a single reel of film with a second, unrelated comedy, Fire! Fire!, starring Billy Bowers and Harry Lorraine. The films were released by the General Film Company on June 6, 1914.

The Female Cop is one of several short comedies made in the spring of 1914 that include the earliest screen appearances of Oliver Hardy. In most of these films he was an uncredited extra, but in this case he was credited as "Babe" Hardy, playing the role of "Boob Cop." Although the film itself does not survive, Hardy can be seen in a promotional still published in The Lubin Bulletin, a newsletter advertising the studio's new releases.

The film received generally poor reviews in the trade papers. Although Moving Picture World declared it "not bad for a comedy of its kind", Motion Picture News considered it "a rather poor finish to the other half of the reel", and The New York Dramatic Mirror wrote, "This concerns the doings of a woman who was appointed policeman, but there is almost total absence of plot and few laughs."

== See also ==
- List of American films of 1914
- Oliver Hardy filmography
