= Gus and the Anarchists =

1915 film

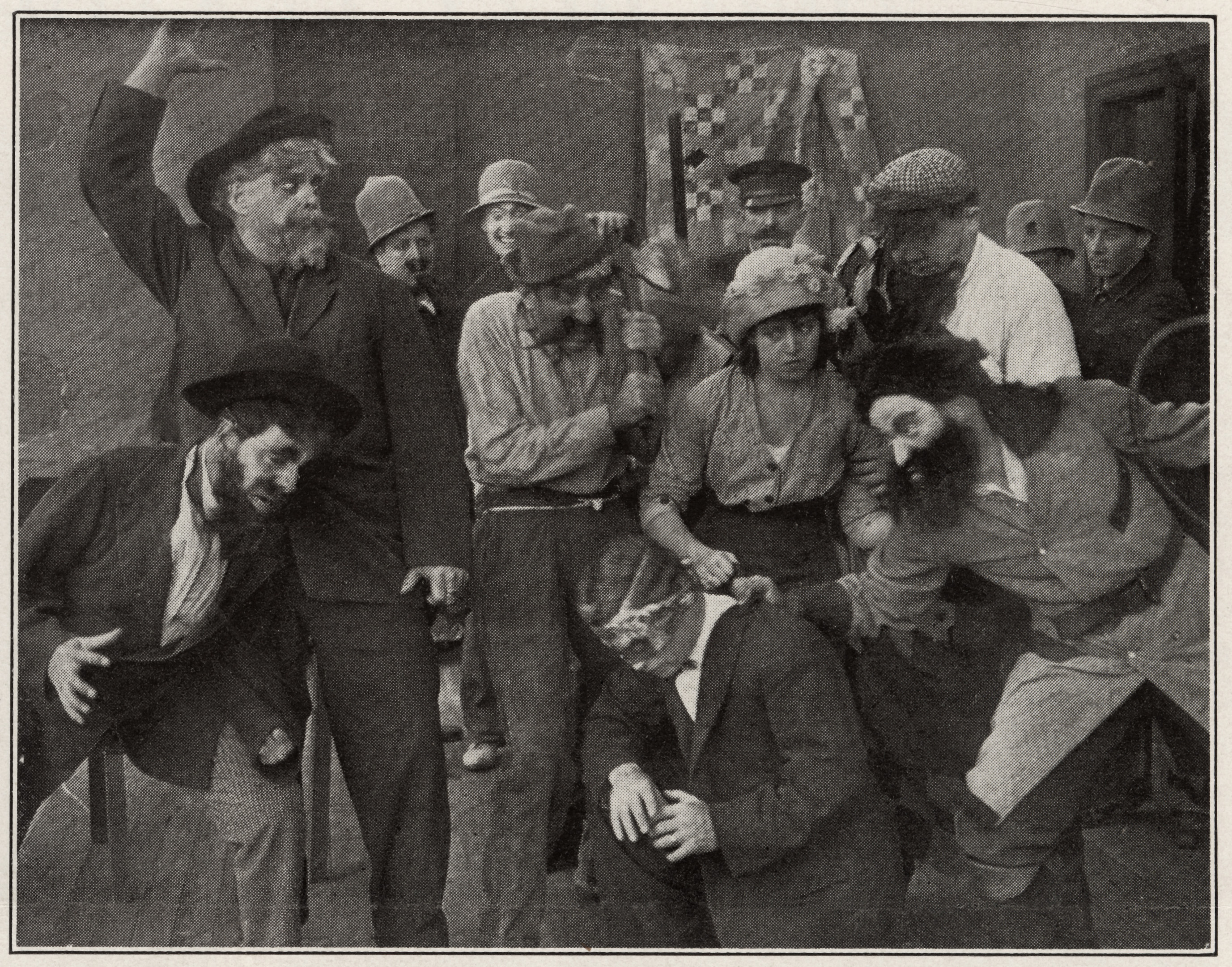
- Babe Hardy (in the white shirt) and the cast in a publicity still for Gus and the Anarchists
- Directed by: John A. Murphy
- Written by: Fred H. Hayn
- Produced by: Arthur Hotaling; Sigmund Lubin
- Starring: Oliver Hardy
- Music by: John R. Madison
- Distributed by: General Film Company
- Release date: January 19, 1915
- Running time: split reel
- Country: United States
- Languages: Silent film English intertitles

Gus and the Anarchists is a 1915 American silent comedy film featuring Oliver Hardy. The film was produced by the Lubin Manufacturing Company.

== Plot ==
Gus, a waiter at a cheap cafe falls in love with Rosy, the coffee cashier. To make fun of him, she tells him that if he wants to be with her, he must become an anarchist like her. Colleagues of Rosy attend the joke, pretending all to be the members of the band of fearsome anarchists. In the place where they meet, Gus is told that, to prove loyal, he must commit murder. But before the mission can be completed, some false policemen break into the bar.

== Cast ==
- Oliver Hardy as Tom Dreck (as Babe Hardy)
- C. W. Ritchie as Gus Goober
- Frances Ne Moyer as Rosy Heintz

== See also ==
- List of American films of 1915
- Oliver Hardy filmography
