= What a Cinch =

1915 film

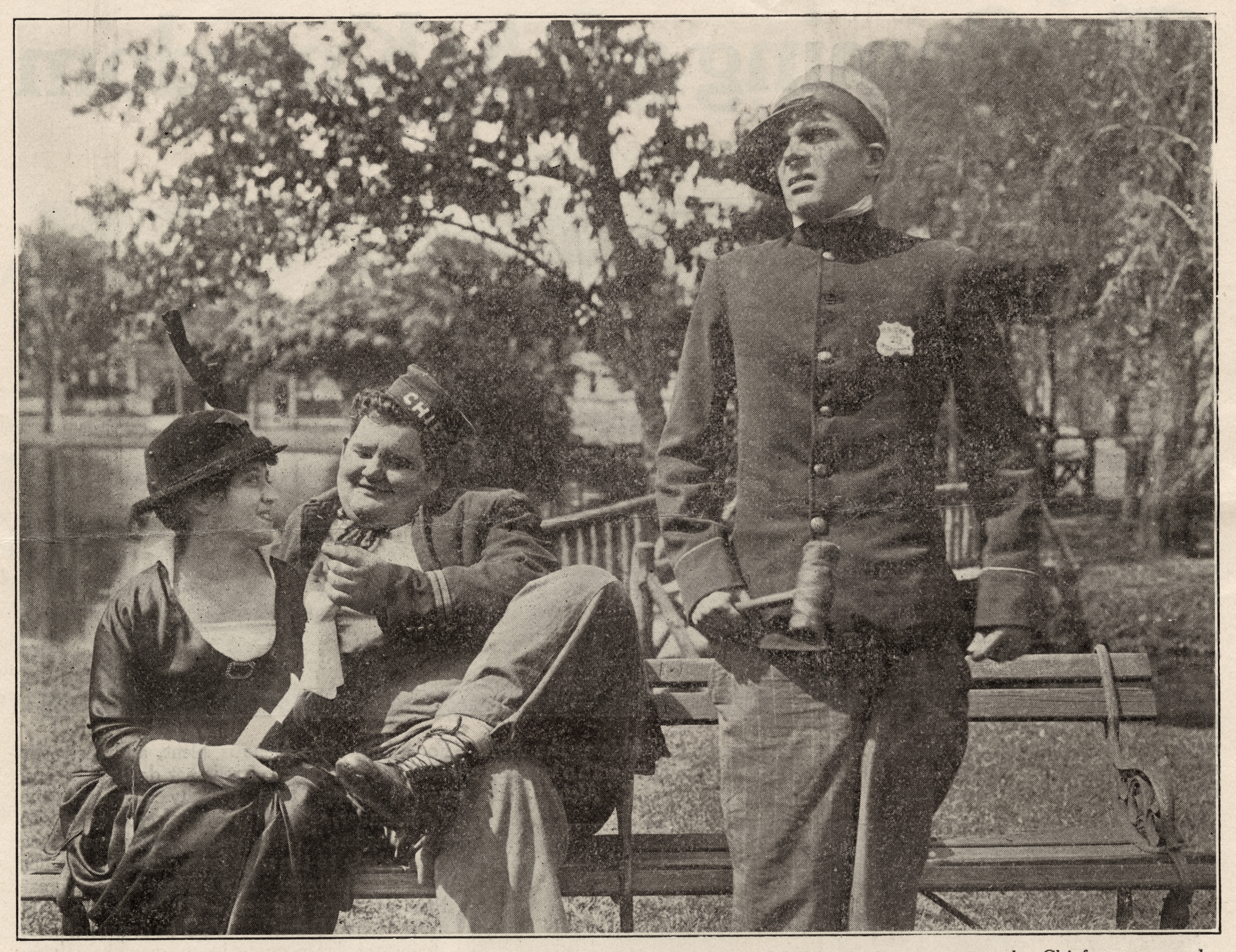
- Frances Ne Moyer, Oliver Hardy, and Raymond McKee in a publicity still from What a Cinch
- Directed by: Will Louis
- Written by: Lorena Weekes
- Produced by: Arthur Hotaling
- Starring: Oliver Hardy
- Release date: July 13, 1915
- Country: United States
- Languages: Silent film English intertitles

What a Cinch is a 1915 film featuring Oliver Hardy.

== Plot ==
This plot summary appeared in The Moving Picture World for July 10, 1915:

Chief of Police Myers is in love with Molly Mason. So is Dick Young, his lieutenant. Molly tells the chief that perhaps she will marry him when he gets $500 Cohen a pawnbroker, calls at the station house to lodge a complaint while Myers is away. Dick is in charge. He Is in a bad bumor and further insults Cohen by fining him twenty dollars. Myers arrives in time to make the entire force apologize, and Dick is forced to return the twenty. Dick frames up a deal to get some easy money. He calls at Cohens shop and leaves an old ginger box in Cohen's care, telling him that he will call for it on his return. Dick disguises himself and calls again at the pawnshop. He spots the ginger box and offers Cohen $500 for it. Cohen is frantic, but he promises to try and secure it for him. Dick lcave3 a fictitious address and departs. Cohen takes the chief into his confidence. Meyers drops his bankroll and when Dick returns he sells the box to Cohen for four hundred. Cohen and Myers start to find the antique collector and find nothing but a vacant lot. They realize that they have been swindled. Myers blames it all on Cohen and proceeds to beat him up.

== Cast ==
- Oliver Hardy as Chief Myers (as Babe Hardy)
- Raymond McKee as Lt. Dick Young
- Frances Ne Moyer as Molly Mason
- Billy Bowers as Cohen, the Pawnbroker

== See also ==
- List of American films of 1915
- Filmography of Oliver Hardy
