= Who's Boss? =

1914 film

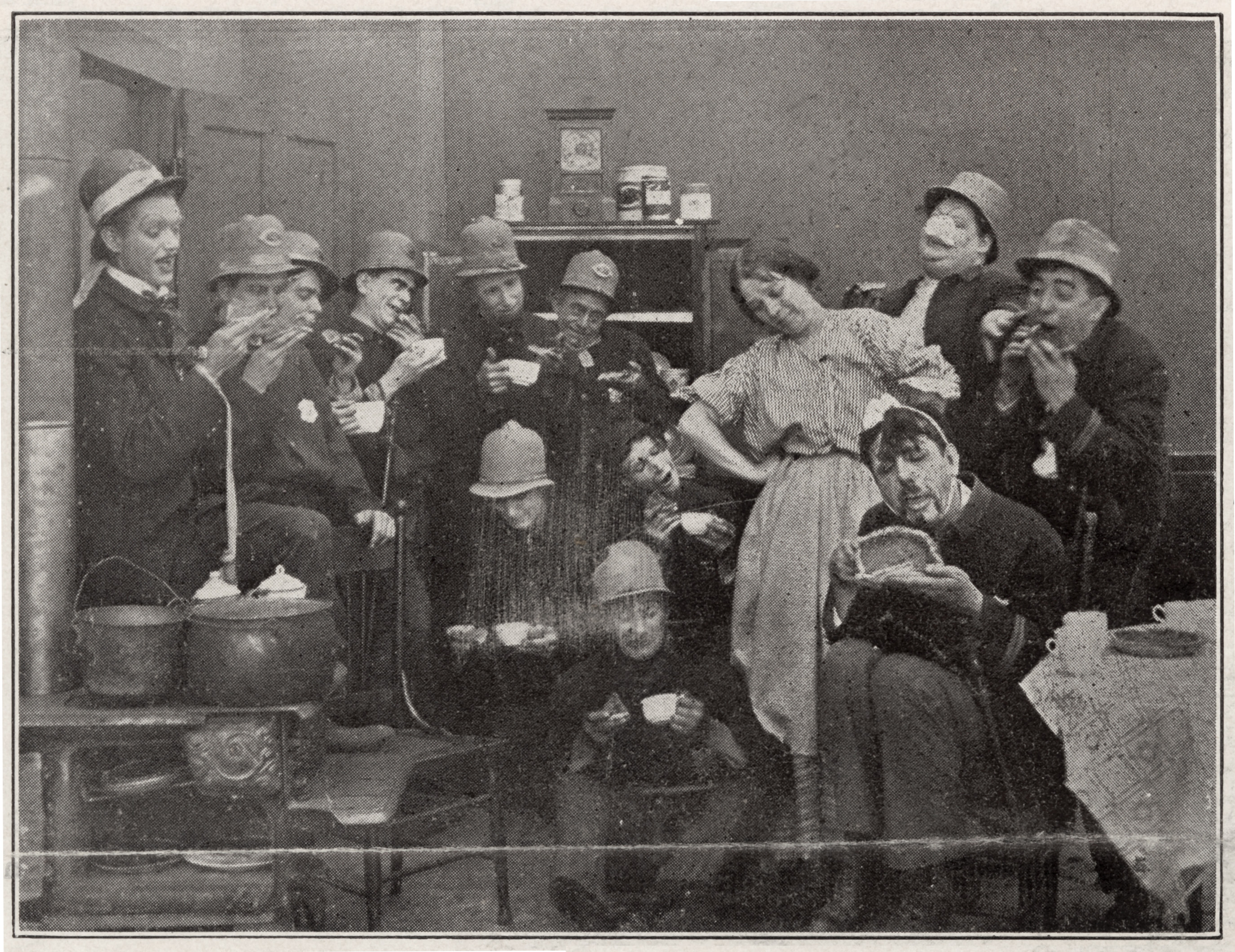
- Publicity still with the cast of Who's Boss?
- Written by: Epes W. Sargent
- Produced by: Arthur Hotaling
- Starring: Harry Lorraine
- Release date: June 27, 1914
- Country: United States
- Languages: Silent film English intertitles

Who's Boss? is a 1914 silent comedy film featuring Oliver Hardy. It was on a comedy split reel with His Sudden Recovery.

== Plot ==
This plot summary appeared in Moving Picture World for June 20, 1914:

Sue Briggs Is a militant suffragette, and even though her husband Is the head of the police force she is not a bit afraid of him and she tells him so, more by her actions than her words. Sue is hospitable and the men of the force all know bow good ber coffee and pies are, and when Pat Murphy gets clubbed by tie chief they take him down to the chief's house to get first aid — and pie. But the subjugation rankles In the police breast and one afternoon when be bas about three good drinks to back him up, the chief determines on revolt. The best way seems to him to be to get his force and awe his wife, so he takes his police whistle and plays a tune In front of the house. Not to be outdone Sue too pipes In front of the house. The forces meet In the house and the men shamelessly desert their chief and at Sue's word of command they jump all over him. The chief is willing to arbitrate even to the point of admitting that Sue Is the boss, after which pie is served. The chief gets his external application, but he hasn't a word to say.

== Cast ==
- Harry Lorraine as Sam Briggs
- Mae Hotely as Sue Briggs
- Billy Bowers as Clancey
- Ben Walker as Pat Murphy
- Oliver Hardy (as Babe Hardy)

== See also ==
- List of American films of 1914
- Oliver Hardy filmography
