= Casey's Birthday =

1914 film

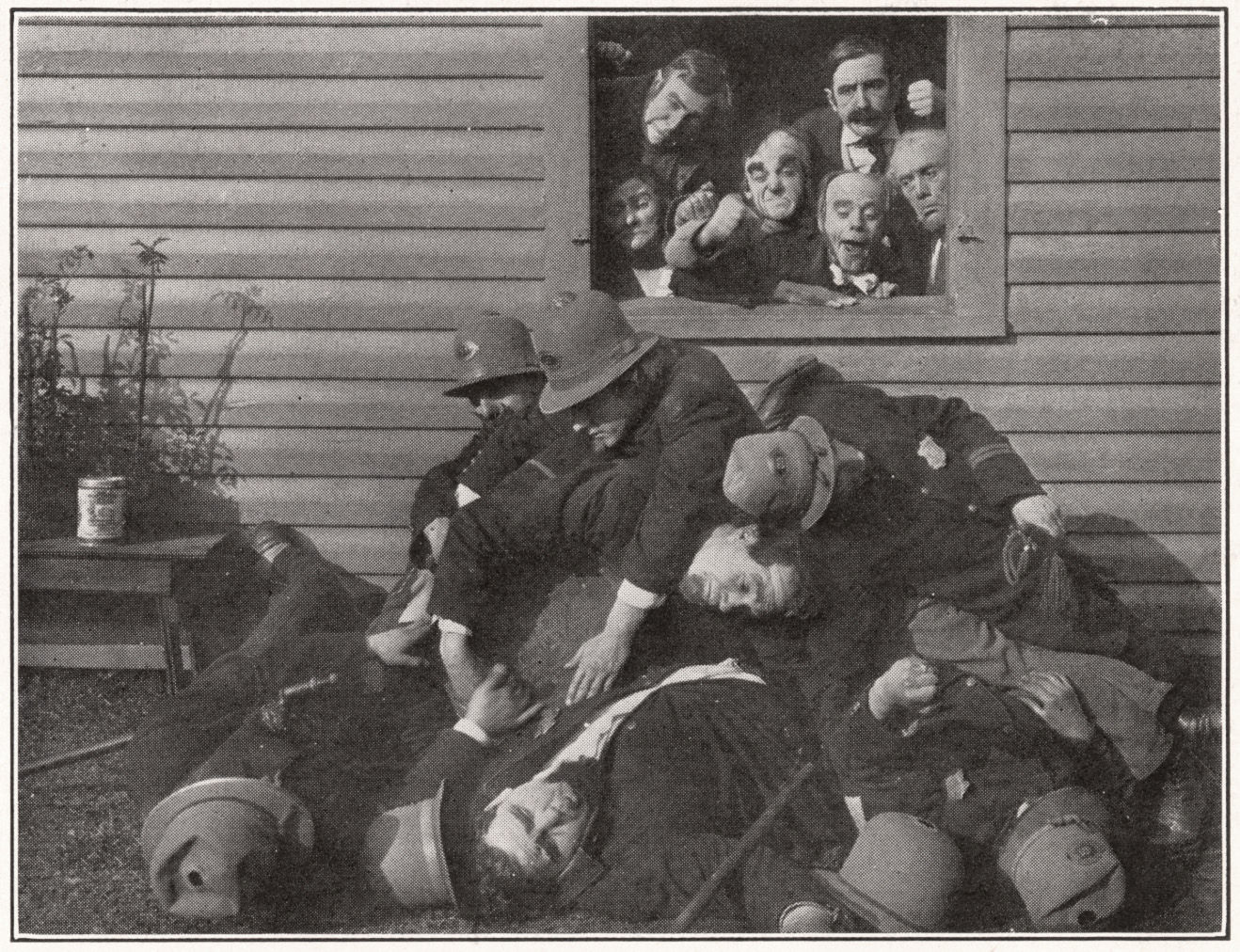
- Publicity still with the cast of Casey's Birthday
- Written by: Charles Barney
- Produced by: Arthur Hotaling
- Starring: Charles Barney; Mae Hotely; Billy Bowers; Oliver Hardy
- Release date: May 5, 1914
- Running time: c. 6\-8 minutes (c. 600 feet)
- Country: United States
- Languages: Silent film English intertitles

Casey's Birthday is a lost 1914 American silent comedy film produced by the Lubin Manufacturing Company and starring Daniel Casey, Mae Hotely, and Billy Bowers. The young Oliver Hardy had a small role.

== Plot ==
"Daniel Casey refuses to work because it is his birthday: he quits his job and starts off to celebrate. Mrs. Casey has prepared a surprise party and to make sure that Casey will come home sober, she sends his friend, Dooley, out to get him. After visiting a number of saloons, Dooley finally finds Casey very drunk. Dooley gets him partly sober and then starts him for the Casey home. The guests arrive and plan to surprise Casey by turning down the lights. Dooley leads Casey into the house, the lights are suddenly turned up, and at first Casey mistakes them for burglars and starts to fight. He is quieted and all proceed to make merry. Mrs. Krausemier, who has the rooms over Casey's, thinks there is a riot, and she telephones for the police. While the Irishmen are having a good time, the police arrive and attempt to stop the noise, but the Irishmen throw them out of the window. The reserves are called out and another attempt is made to break up the party, but Casey tosses a keg of beer to the police, and they forget all about duty. The guests are called to eat. Mrs. Casey has baked a cake which bears the inscription, "Papa." One of the Irishmen for a joke removes the letter "P," leaving "APA." Casey sees this, goes wild, cleans up the party and chases the guests. Monarch of all he surveys, Casey takes the floor for a bed, wraps himself in a rug, and falls asleep."

== Cast ==
- Charles Barney as Daniel Casey
- Mae Hotely as Mrs. Casey
- Billy Bowers as Mike Dooley
- Oliver Hardy as a policeman

== Production, release, and reception ==
Casey's Birthday was filmed in Jacksonville, Florida, and produced by Arthur Hotaling, who supervised the films made in the Lubin company's Jacksonville studio. It was released on May 5, 1914, as a split-reel short, sharing a single 1000-foot reel of film with a second, unrelated film, The Blind Business. Reviews in the industry papers were lukewarm: Motion Picture News wrote, "Casey celebrates by getting gloriously drunk, and getting into various mix-ups, most of which are too silly to be comical"; but according to the New York Dramatic Mirror, "There is plenty of life in Casey's birthday celebration. The farce, completing a reel with A Blind Business, is acted with spirit and gets a fair number of laughs."

The gag involving the birthday cake was singled out for comment by Moving Picture World: "There is a big legitimate laugh in this picture, shown on the same reel with A Blind Business, when the letter "P" is knocked off a birthday cake originally lettered "P-A-P-A" and created for a fighting Irish laborer who has sadly interfered with his own birthday surprise party by bringing home a "stew." The letters "A-P-A" in accidental combination provide the finishing touches to an already too rough house." (The letters APA were the abbreviation of the anti-Catholic American Protective Association, which opposed immigration by Catholics, including Irishmen.)

The film is remembered today chiefly for being one of the earliest screen appearances of Oliver Hardy, who appeared in a bit part as one of the crowd of policeman. (Hardy is not named in the publicity for the film and his participation is known only from his appearance in a promotional still.)

== See also ==
- List of American films of 1914
- Oliver Hardy filmography
