= Dead letter (disambiguation) =

A Dead letter is mail that can neither be delivered nor returned to sender—see dead letter mail

It can also refer to:

- Dead letter law, a type of unenforced law
- Dead letter queue, a sink queue when a message fails

== Film and television ==
- The Dead Letter, a 1915 American silent comedy film starring Oliver Hardy
- Dead Letters (film), a 2007 American film
- "Dead Letter" (Murder, She Wrote), a 1989 television episode
- "Dead Letters" (Millennium), a 1996 television episode

== Music ==
- Dead Letters, an album by the Rasmus, 2003
- "Dead Letter", a song by Angelspit from Krankhaus, 2006
- "Dead Letters", a song by Katatonia from Dead End Kings, 2012
