= The Prize Baby =

1915 film

- Directed by: Jerold T. Hevener
- Written by: Edwin R. Coffin
- Produced by: Arthur Hotaling
- Starring: Oliver Hardy
- Release date: March 20, 1915
- Country: United States
- Languages: Silent film English intertitles

The Prize Baby is a 1915 American silent comedy film featuring Oliver Hardy.

== Plot ==
This plot summary was published in The Moving Picture World for March 27, 1915:

The Blood & Gore Company has a tragic end In Kettleville. The stranded actors endeavor to beat their board bill by lowering themselves from an upstairs window of the hotel by the light of the moon, and after being shot at a few times by the proprietor, make their getaway. After traveling weary miles over the rails, on foot, they lie down to rest for the night in an old corn field. The next day brings them to a town, where they learn that a "Better Baby" show is going to be held that afternoon. The grand prize to be given is $1OO. They at once resolve to win the prize. The fat boy of the company proposes to wear a baby's costume that he uses in the show. Thev all think it a good idea and dress him up. thev get an old cart and wheel him to the show. He is awarded the first prize on account of his wonderful development and causes much amusement. All goes well until one of the infants is taken ill with smallpox and the whole place is quarantined They undertake to vaccinate the big baby but he objects and a free-for-all flght is started. The police are summoned and the Big Baby is wheeled away and locked up. 'Thus leaving the Blood & Gore Company again stranded.

== Cast ==
- Oliver Hardy as Bill, the Prize Baby (as Babe Hardy)
- Raymond McKee as Pip
- Billy Bowers as Boots
- Frances Ne Moyer as Florence

== See also ==
- Oliver Hardy filmography
