= Long May It Wave =

1914 film

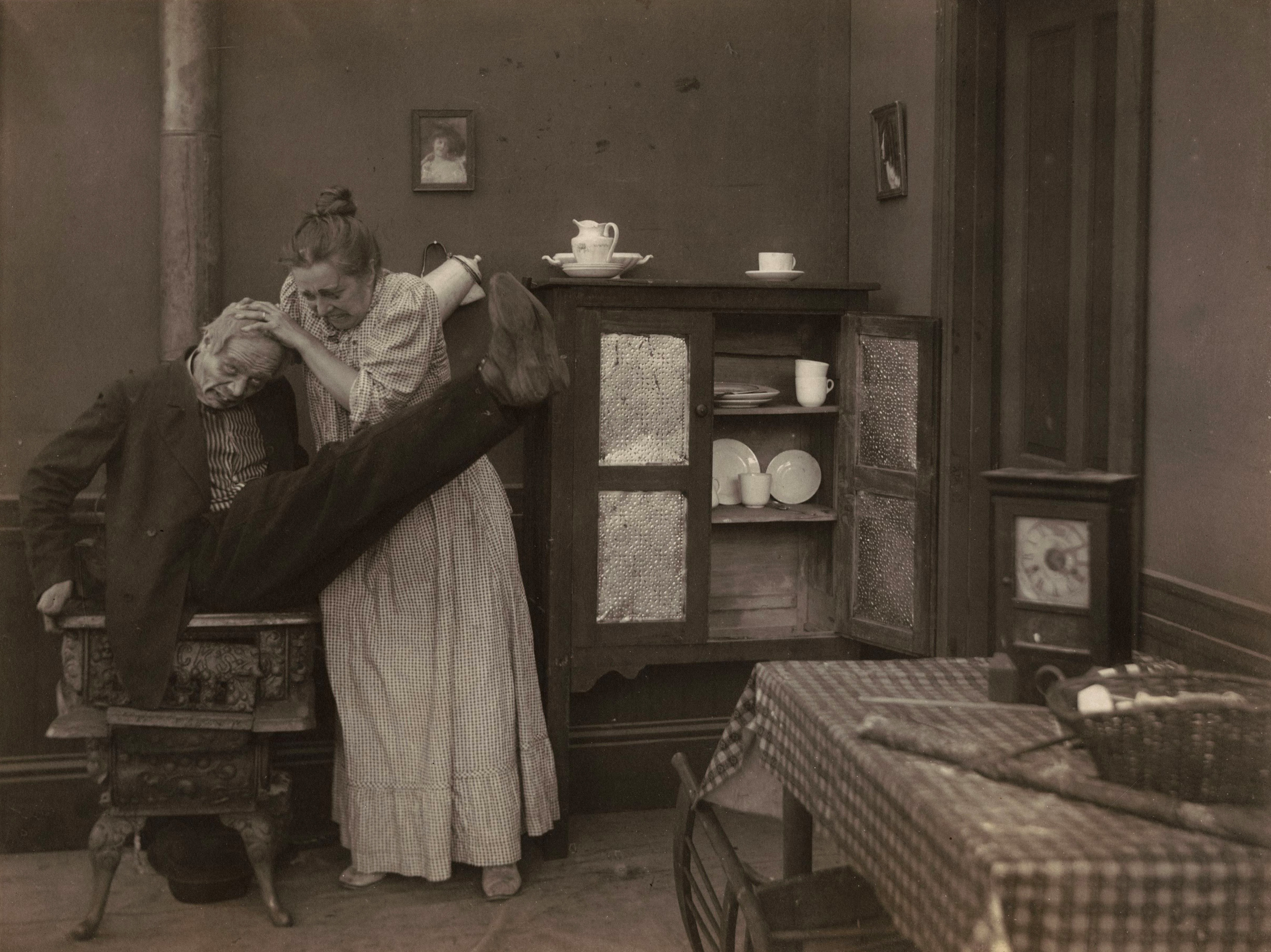
- Promotional still from Long May It Wave with Raymond McKee and Mae Hotely
- Directed by: John A. Murphy
- Written by: Epes W. Sargent
- Produced by: Arthur Hotaling
- Starring: Raymond McKee; Mae Hotely; Marguerite Ne Moyer; Ben Walker; Oliver Hardy
- Release date: June 20, 1914
- Running time: 7–8 minutes (c. 600 feet)
- Country: United States
- Languages: Silent film English intertitles

Long May It Wave is a lost 1914 American silent comedy film produced by the Lubin Manufacturing Company, featuring Raymond McKee, Mae Hotely, Marguerite Ne Moyer, Ed Lawrence, Ben Walker, and Oliver Hardy.

== Plot ==
Pat McCarthy's wife Nora has "a strong fist and a short temper", and she hurls a dishpan at him when he forgets to bring in the coal. To patch things up he buys two tickets to a "lurid melodrama" entitled The Flag We Love, in which a series of characters are saved from terrible fates by brandishing the American flag. First, an evil general tries to take the heroine by force, but she waves the flag at him and he desists. Then her sweetheart is condemned to death, but she arrives with the flag just in time and the execution is foiled. Finally, the general hauls the hero and heroine before the king on charges of treason, but three flag-waving marines appear to protect the lovers. Taking the story to heart, Pat buys an American flag for protection from Nora before he returns home (along with an Irish flag for good measure). At first the plan is successful, but when Nora offers him a drink, he sets the flags down, at which point she seizes him and sits him on the hot stove until he repents.

== Cast ==
- Raymond McKee as Pat McCarthy
- Mae Hotely as Nora McCarthy
- Marguerite Ne Moyer as Lucille, the heroine
- Ben Walker as Paul, the hero
- Ed Lawrence as General Grabimoff
- Oliver Hardy as the King (credited as Babe Hardy)

== Production and reception ==
Long May It Wave was filmed in Jacksonville, Florida, at the Jacksonville unit of the Lubin Manufacturing Company, under the supervision of Arthur Hotaling. It was a short split-reel comedy, lasting approximately 7–8 minutes, and sharing a single reel with a second, unrelated film, Getting Solid with Pa, starring Jimmy Hodges, Frances Ne Moyer, and Billy Bowers. The films were released by the General Film Company on June 16, 1914.

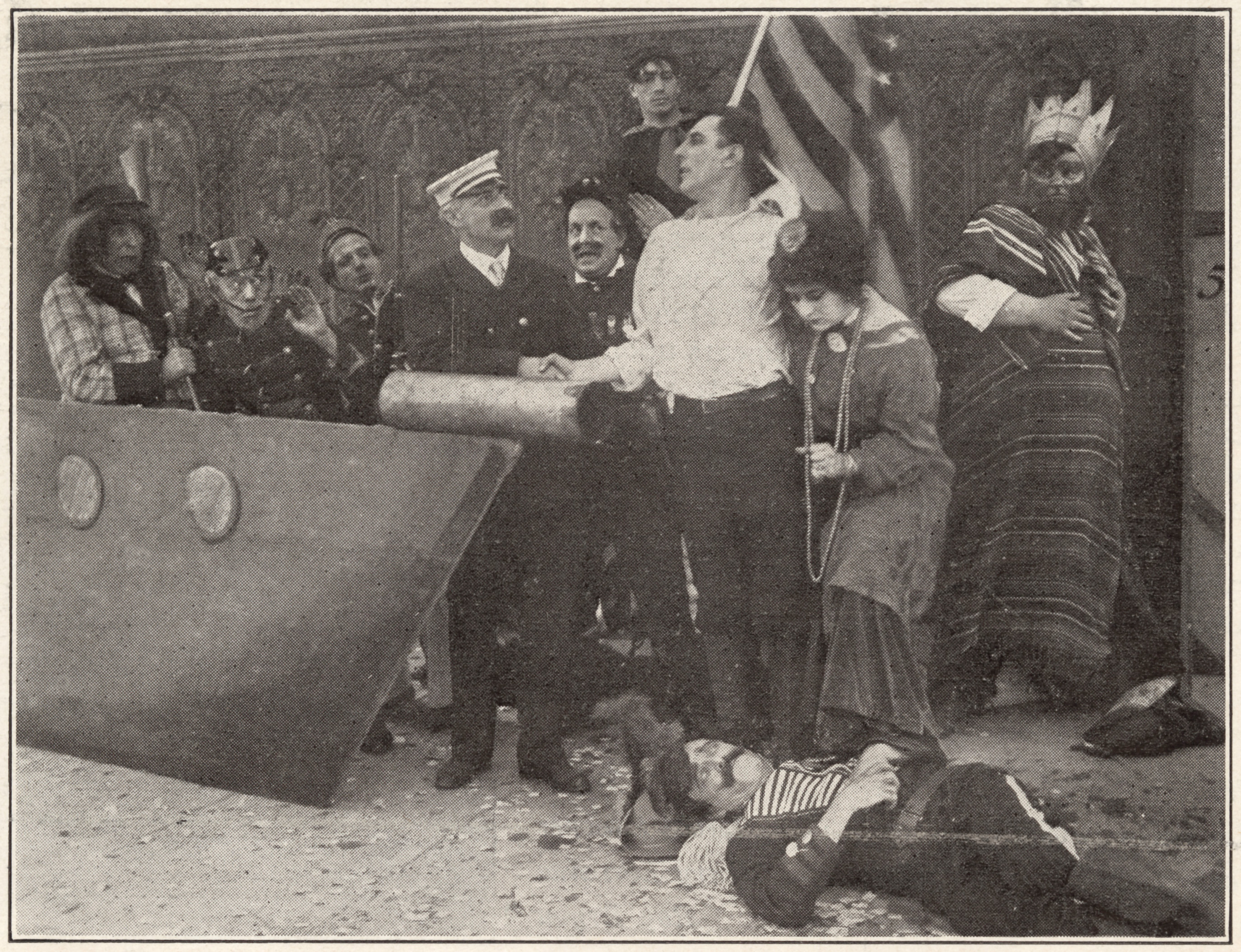
Promotional still from Long May It Wave, with Babe Hardy as the king at far right

Long May It Wave is one of several short comedies made in the spring and summer of 1914 that include the first screen appearances of Oliver Hardy. Although the film itself is lost, Hardy's name (as Babe Hardy) appears in the cast list and he can be seen as the king, wearing a striped robe and a large crown, in a promotional still from the film published in The Lubin Bulletin, the newsletter advertising the studio's new releases.

The film was written by Epes W. Sargent, who discussed the construction of the final gag in a column of advice for screenwriters published in The Moving Picture World in July 1914:

It may help the student of the real technique to study the climax of Long May it Wave, a Lubin comedy scheduled for release June 20th. This is a rather good example of the double climax. A man takes his wife to see a play in which the American Flag waved overtime, as used to happen in the palmy days of melodrama. The climax of each act is salvation through the flag. A few nights later he comes home late with two flags, and defies his wife. This is the natural and expected climax. It is funny but it is not startling, for several scenes back you saw him pick up the flags. You knew then how it was going to end. A moment later the wife offers him a drink, apparently to celebrate the victory. He lays down the flags for a glass. She grabs him. No one expected that. It will get more laughs after the laughs would seem to have been exhausted, but it should be borne in mind that this second kick must come like a flash to have any real value. It must not be something requiring elaborate explanation. It must seemingly be unpremeditated and must come as a total surprise.

Long May It Wave was well received by the reviewers for the trade papers. Motion Picture News wrote that "a foolish play is enacted in this half of the reel, which will cause universal laughter." Moving Picture World described it as "a ludicrous old plot about a hen-pecked husband," but added that "it gains laughs by its absolute absurdity." The New York Dramatic Mirror wrote, "This short skit is about as funny as they come at any length. E. W. Sargent is the author, and he has introduced some genuine humor. Besides it is well handled and reproduced.".

== See also ==
- List of American films of 1914
- Oliver Hardy filmography
