= Avenging Bill =

1915 film

- Directed by: John A. Murphy
- Written by: Epes W. Sargent
- Produced by: Arthur Hotaling
- Starring: Oliver Hardy
- Release date: August 31, 1915
- Country: United States
- Languages: Silent film English intertitles

Avenging Bill is a 1915 American silent film featuring Oliver Hardy, made in Jacksonville, Florida, by the Lubin Film Company.

== Plot ==
Bill is a grocer's boy working for the Grouches. When Lucy witnesses Mr. Grouch abusing Bill, she attacks Mr. Grouch with a knife, chasing him through the house and yard. Police arrive on the scene but cannot belief young Lucy posed any threat to "a husky brute like Grouch". Lucy and Bill take their own revenge on the Grouches, and leave their employment to get married.

== Cast ==
- Mabel Paige as Lucy
- Royal Byron as Mr. Grouch
- Eloise Willard as Mrs. Grouch
- Oliver Hardy as Bill, the Grocer's Boy (as Babe Hardy)

== See also ==
- List of American films of 1915
- Filmography of Oliver Hardy
