= Dobs at the Shore =

1914 film

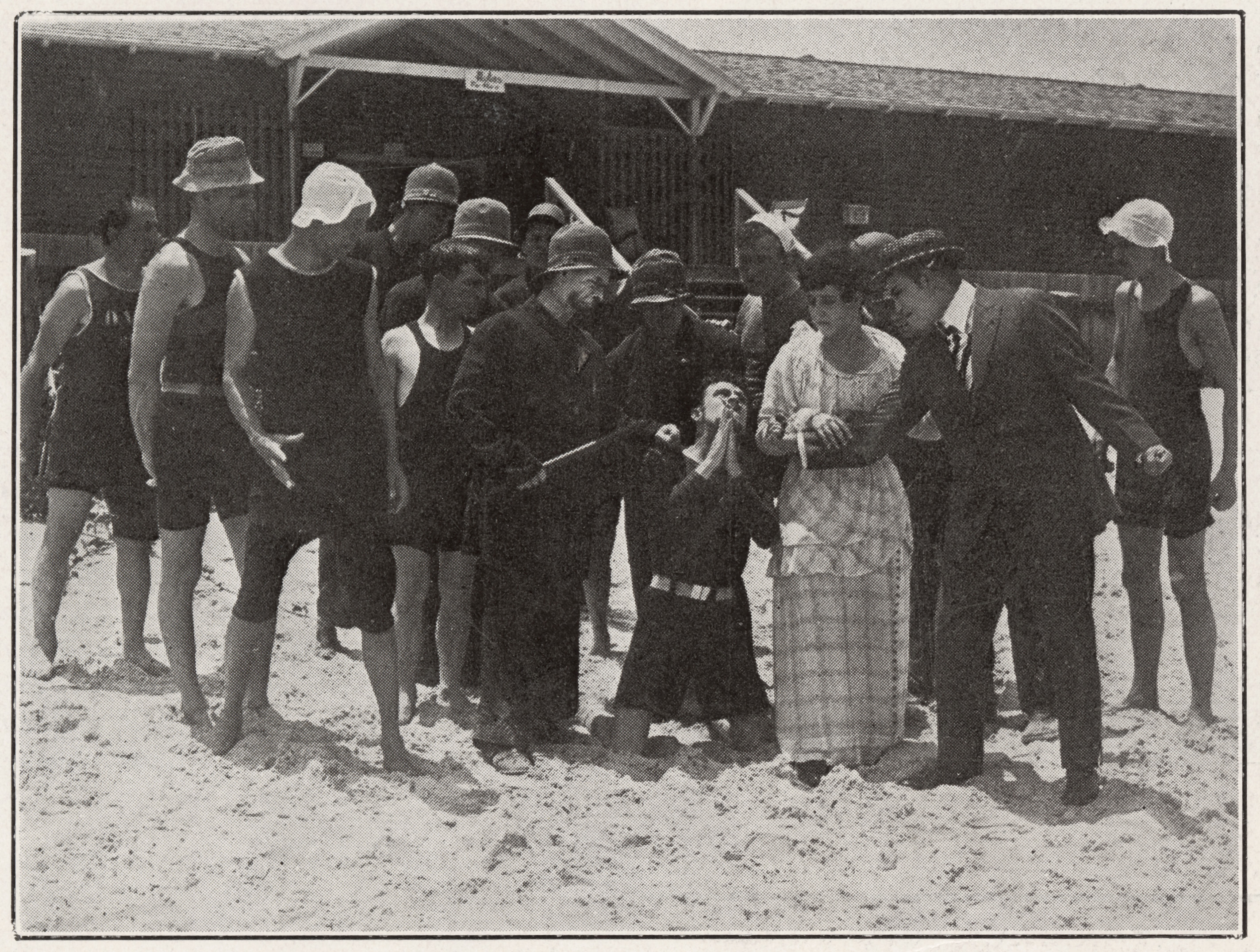
- Publicity still for Dobs at the Shore
- Directed by: Frank C. Griffin
- Written by: Frank C. Griffin
- Produced by: Arthur Hotaling
- Starring: Frank C. Griffin; Oliver Hardy; Raymond McKee; Frances Ne Moyer
- Release date: December 8, 1914
- Running time: c. 8 minutes (600 feet)
- Country: United States
- Languages: Silent film English intertitles

Dobs at the Shore is a 1914 American split-reel silent comedy film produced by the Lubin Manufacturing Company and starring Frank Griffin, Oliver Hardy, Raymond McKee, and Frances Ne Moyer.

== Plot ==
This plot summary was published in Moving Picture World for December 5, 1914:

Jemula Heckla and his wife are spending the day at the shore when Helen Martin, a young and beautiful heiress, escorted by Count Casco, are preparing for a dip in the ocean. While the Count has gone to get Helen an ice-cream cone, Mrs. Heckla falls asleep and Jemula starts to flirt with Helen. Afraid that his wife will wake up, Jem makes a dummy out of the sand, drapes his coat and hat around it, puts it at his wife's side and sneaks off. Sneaking over to Helen's side Jem attempts to kiss her, when the Count returns and smashes the ice-cream cone in Jem's face. Jem kicks the Count in the chest, and he falls over Jem's sleeping wife. She jumps up, thinks the Count has smashed her husband and starts to beat him up. Hearing a yell Mrs. Heckla turns and sees her husband trying to kiss Helen. Snatching a revolver that is in the old carpet bag, Mrs. Heckla starts chasing her husband, Helen and the Count. She chases her husband and the Count into the ocean where they almost drown. Helen runs off for the police and the life guards. The Count climbs up a rope to the top of a pier. Jem climbs the other side, while his wife is running along the beach looking for him. The life guards are diving for Jem and the Count. On the top of the pier Jem sneaks up on the Count and knocks him off the pier. Jem is about to start for the shore when he sees the police force headed by Helen dashing along the pier. In his excitement he falls off. The cops dash out on the end of the pier, grab a rope and throw it to the struggling men in the water. Jem, the Count and two of the life guards grab the rope and yell for the cops to pull them in. The cops on the pier are pulling on the rope. Mrs. Heckla sees them from the other end of the pier and she starts to shoot. The cops drop the rope and dive off the pier among the struggling crowd in the water. Mrs. Heckla runs to the end of the pier and starts shooting at the men in the water. Helen, who has been hiding behind a post, jumps and runs for the bath house. Mrs. Heckla catches Jem just as he is sneaking out of the water; she grabs him and drags him off. The cops take charge of the Count, who is arrested for attempted suicide.

== Cast ==
- Frank C. Griffin as Jemula Heckla
- Oliver Hardy as Meggie Heckla (credited as Babe Hardy)
- Frances Ne Moyer as Helen Martin
- Raymond McKee as Count Casco
- Don Ferrando as Bob Fisher

== Production and reception ==
Dobs at the Shore was written and directed by Frank C. Griffin and produced by Arthur Hotaling, the general supervisor of the Jacksonville, Florida unit of the Lubin Manufacturing Company of Philadelphia. It was a short split-reel comedy, lasting approximately eight minutes and sharing a single reel of film with He Made His Mark, an unrelated comedy written by Epes W. Sargent. The films were released by the General Film Company on December 8, 1914, and are among a group of short comedies made by the Lubin company in 1914 and early 1915 that include the earliest screen appearances of Oliver Hardy. In this film, as in several other Lubin comedies, Hardy played a female character.

The reviews in the trade papers were generally positive and emphasized the unrestrained slapstick character of the film. Motion Picture News described it as "a wild series of rough and tumble scenes in which slapstick comedy is seen at its height". The New York Dramatic Mirror wrote "Frank C. Griffin must be credited with this very funny slapstick effort.... The plot is inessential as such plots go, but the more negligible the story, in such offerings very often the funnier the result, as is the case here. Suffice to say that after the principals have worked themselves into a fury of throwing and swatting the police are called, and the offering ends by all taking one or more dunkings." Some reviews singled out Hardy's performance for special mention: Moving Picture World called the film "a series of absurdities from start to finish" and "a rough and tumble farce in which about the funniest feature is Babe Hardy, in a female character"; and the reviewer for The Bioscope wrote "In this seaside comedy, Babe Hardy is endowed with a fine part as the Brobdingnagian better half of Dobs. The latter makes up a dummy, which is left by the side of his sleeping spouse while he flirts with the fair bathing companion of Count Casco. The fun becomes of a very lively order when the gentle wife awakes."

== See also ==
- List of American films of 1914
- Oliver Hardy filmography
