= The Servant Girl's Legacy =

1914 film

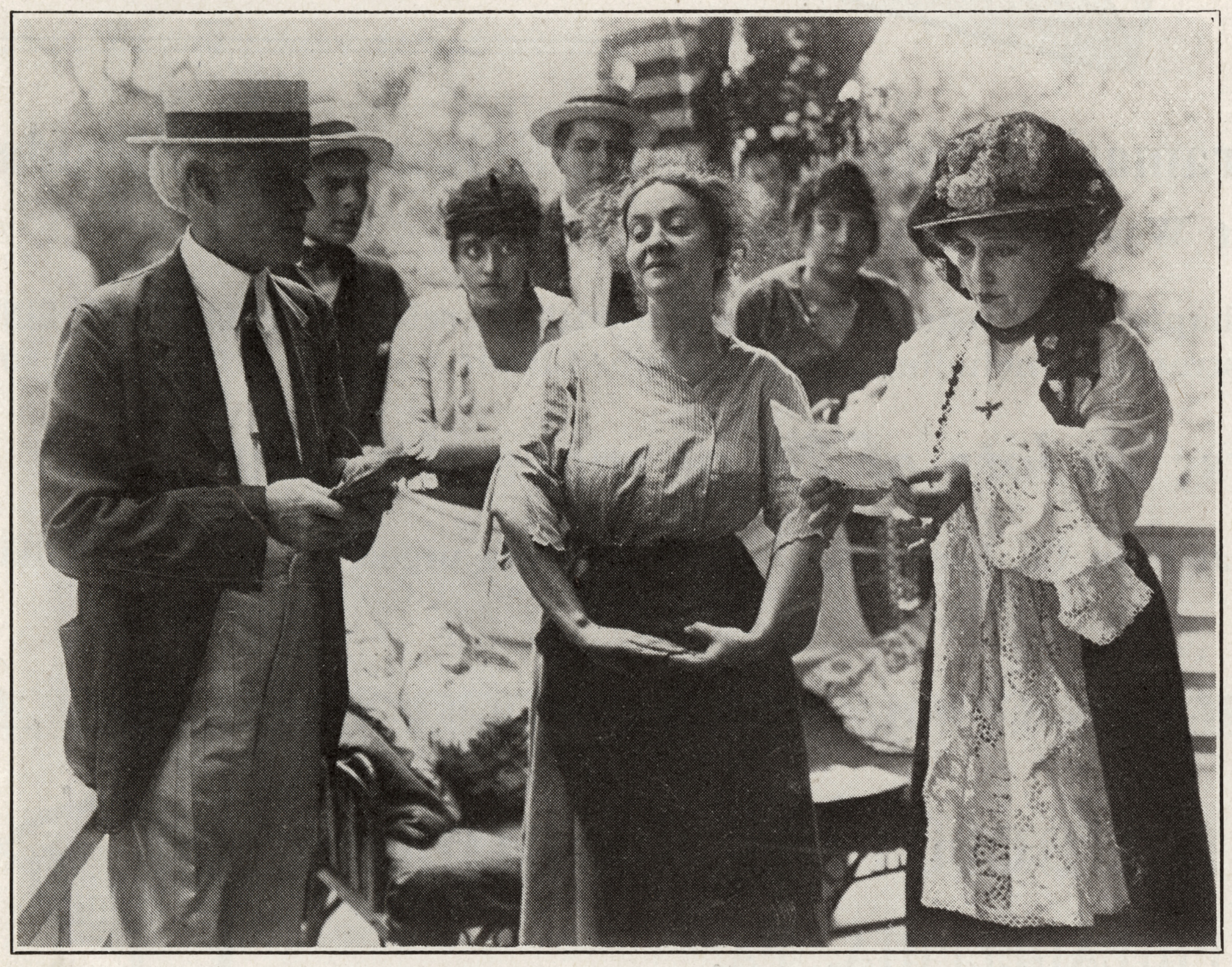
- Ed Lawrence, Mabel Paige, and Eloise Willard in a publicity still from The Servant Girl's Legacy
- Directed by: Arthur Hotaling
- Written by: Epes W. Sargent
- Produced by: Lubin Manufacturing Company
- Starring: Mabel Paige; Oliver Hardy
- Release date: November 28, 1914
- Running time: c. 8 minutes (600 feet)
- Country: United States
- Languages: Silent film English intertitles

The Servant Girl's Legacy is a 1914 American split-reel silent comedy film produced by the Lubin Manufacturing Company and starring Mabel Paige and Oliver Hardy.

== Plot ==
Mandy, a servant girl, is loved by Cy, the gardener, but she rejects his advances. She receives a telegram informing her that she has inherited her uncle's entire fortune. The family that employs her now welcomes her as an equal, and the suitors of the family's two daughters are eager to court her with flowers and chocolates, to Cy's dismay. But when a second telegram reveals that the amount of the inheritance is only $25, they abandon her. Cy, however, still loves her, and Mandy repays his loyalty by agreeing to marry him. Then a third telegram reveals that the figure of $25 was a copying error, and the legacy is actually $250,000. The suitors promptly return, but Mandy sticks with the faithful Cy.

The Servant Girl's Legacy

== Cast ==
- Mabel Paige as Mandy Spragg
- Oliver Hardy as Cy Whitfield (credited as Babe Hardy)
- Ed Lawrence as Pa
- Eloise Willard as Ma
- Marguerite Ne Moyer as Bess
- Frances Ne Moyer as Grace
- Raymond McKee as Tim
- Royal Byron as Jim
- Bert Tracy as the Messenger

== Production and reception ==
The Servant Girl's Legacy was written by Epes W. Sargent and produced and directed by Arthur Hotaling, who was the general supervisor of the Jacksonville, Florida unit of the Lubin Manufacturing Company of Philadelphia. It was a short split-reel comedy, lasting approximately eight minutes and sharing a single reel of film with You Can't Beat Them, an unrelated comedy also written by Sargent and starring J. A. Murphy, Eva Bell, and Mabel Paige. The films were released by the General Film Company on November 28, 1914, and are among a group of short comedies made by the Lubin company in 1914 and early 1915 that include the earliest screen appearances of Oliver Hardy.

The film received favorable reviews in the trade papers, which praised the execution and the performances while noting the lack of originality in the plot. Moving Picture World described it as "another Sargent comedy which is greeted with laughter. The theme is not altogether original, but has been cleverly worked out, and the longer it runs the funnier it gets, until the finish is a howl." The review in The Bioscope called it an "exceedingly well-played comedy. Has a somewhat obvious plot, but enough comical incident to enable it to score a success anywhere".

== Preservation and home video ==
The Servant Girl's Legacy is one of the earliest Oliver Hardy films known to survive. In 1996 Rob Stone described it as the most readily available of Hardy's Lubin comedies. It was one of over 500 reels of silent film found in 1978 in Dawson City, Yukon Territory, in an abandoned swimming pool that had been sealed and built over by a hockey rink in the 1920s; the cold temperatures of the Canadian arctic proved ideal for the preservation of the nitrate film stock. It was restored in 2020 by the Library of Congress and Lobster Films from the only known nitrate print, recovered in Dawson City and now in the Library of Congress, and was issued on the Blu-ray set Laurel or Hardy: Early Solo Films of Stan Laurel and Oliver Hardy.

== See also ==
- List of American films of 1914
- Oliver Hardy filmography
