= Shoddy the Tailor =

1915 film

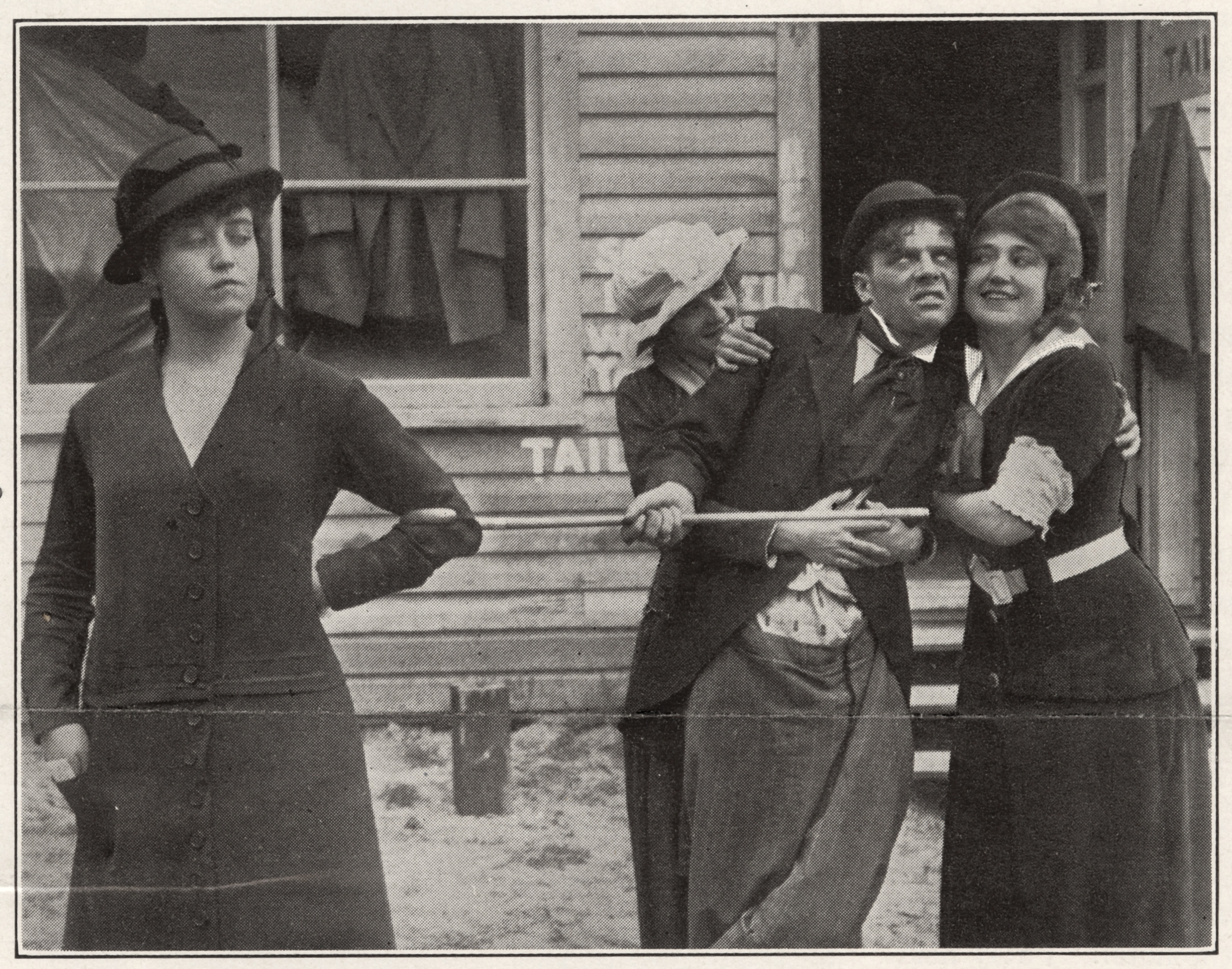
- Mabel Paige and Raymond McKee in a publicity still from Shoddy, the Tailor
- Directed by: Will Louis (aka: Willard Louis)
- Written by: Epes W. Sargent
- Produced by: Sigmund Lubin
- Starring: Raymond McKee
- Distributed by: General Film Company
- Release date: January 23, 1915
- Running time: 1 reel
- Country: United States
- Languages: Silent film English intertitles

Shoddy the Tailor is a 1915 American silent comedy film featuring Oliver Hardy. This was Hardy's last film in Jacksonville, Florida, because Lubin closed that studio.

== Plot ==
This plot summary was published in The Moving Picture World for January 16, 1915:

Henry Bugg is the only tailor in Riverside. He is only one-tenth of a man, but he thinks he is one of the real fellows and a regular lady killer. He flirts with the girls who are in love with the police, and gets pretty well clubbed up. , The Riverside police are lined up for inspection and they look as though they had been sleeping In their clothes for a month. The chief orders them to get their suits pressed and. all unsuspecting, they go to Henry Bugg. Bugg realizes that this is the best chance he ll ever have to get square. He makes away with the uniforms and then takes the train out of town. The girls go down to the shop to wait for the police and this creates a rather embarrassing situation, but they sneak out into the yard and over the fence, induce a kindly maiden lady to chase the girls out and hand them some clothes.

The chief, told by the girls, comes down and the second line-up finds them in everything but the uniforms. Bugg sends a telegram telling where the uniforms are and an inspection takes place with the shivering force in suits wringing wet. The worst of it is that the girls all laugh and run away. Buggs gets his revenge, though he is too far away to thoroughly enjoy it.

== Cast ==
- Raymond McKee – Henry Buggs
- Harry Lorraine – Police Chief
- Mabel Paige – Myrtle, an Old Maid
- Frances Ne Moyer – Minnie
- Eva Bell – Clara
- Nellie Farron – Ruth
- Oliver Hardy – Policeman (as Babe Hardy)

== See also ==
- List of American films of 1915
- Oliver Hardy filmography
