= The Twin Sister =

1915 film

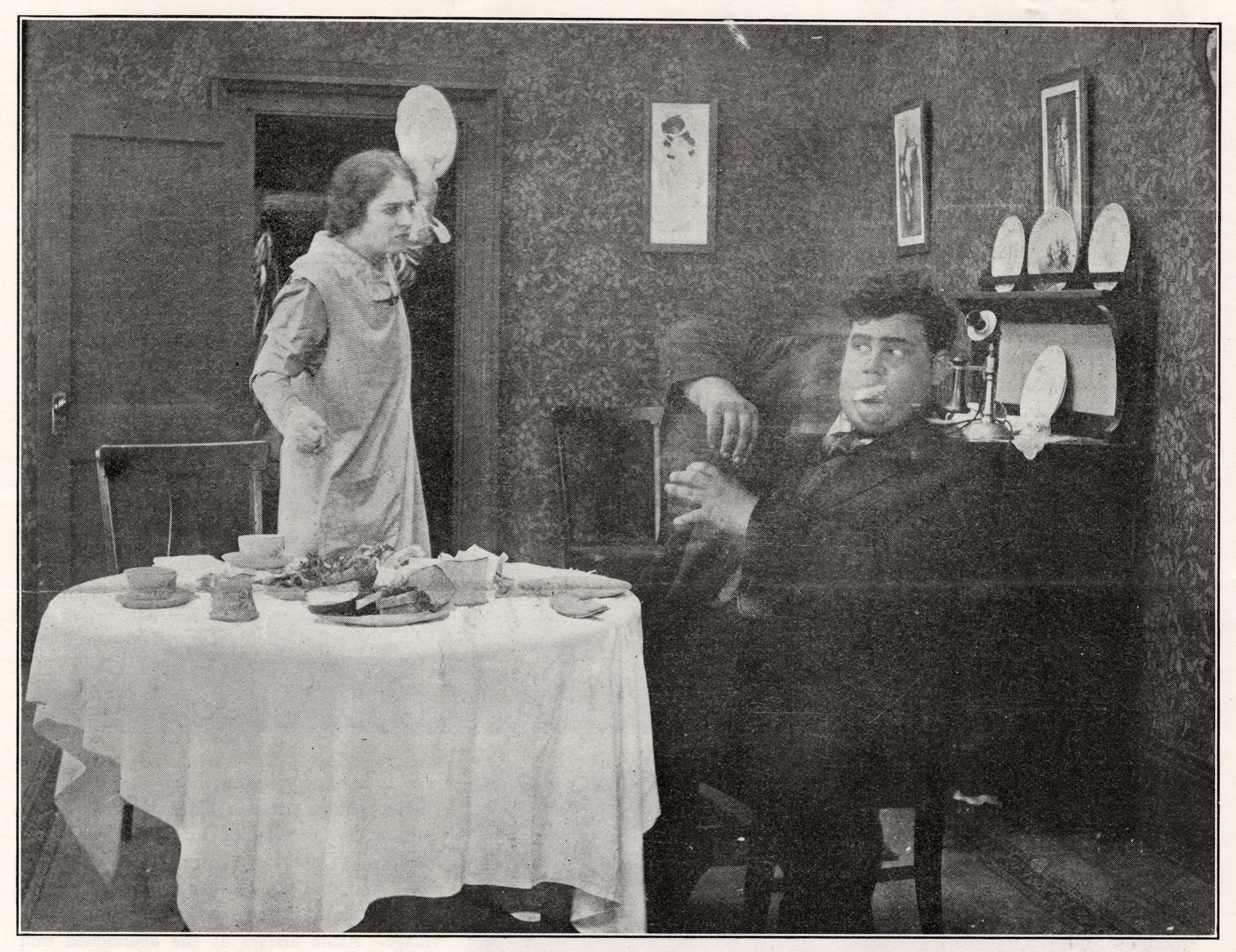
- Mae Hotely and Oliver Hardy in a publicity still from The Twin Sister
- Directed by: Arthur Hotaling
- Written by: Epes W. Sargent
- Produced by: Arthur Hotaling
- Starring: Mae Hotely
- Release date: May 4, 1915
- Country: United States
- Languages: Silent film English intertitles

The Twin Sister, also called The Twin Sisters, is a 1915 American silent comedy film featuring Oliver Hardy. It was on a split reel with Curses! Jack Dalton.

== Plot ==
This plot summary was published in The Moving Picture World for May 1, 1915:

Eva Bolton, in spite of the fact that she is bigger than her husband, is the slave of a dome&tic tyrant. Just because she asks for a coupie oi dollars for household expenses, he makes an awful row and storms off to business, leaving her heartbroken. She has about decided to leave home when she gets a letter from her twin sister, Nancy, announcing her arrival. She leaves a note for Nancy telling her that she has gone home to her mother because that she can't live with her husband and asks Nancy to follow her there. But Nancy is not like Eva and Bill doesn't know she is in town. She settles down and when Bill gets home, he tries his pranks on Nancy, thinking it is his wife Eva, as they look so much alike. Nancy leads Bill a merry chase at the end of which Bill is glad to hand over all the cash. Nancy then calls Eva on the telephone and tells her that she can come home as she has cured Bill. Eva returns home and finds a very different husband awaiting her.

782

== Cast ==
- Mae Hotely as Eva Bolt/Nancy, her twin sister
- Oliver Hardy as Bill Bolt

== See also ==
- List of American films of 1915
- Oliver Hardy filmography
