= The Dead Letter =

1915 film

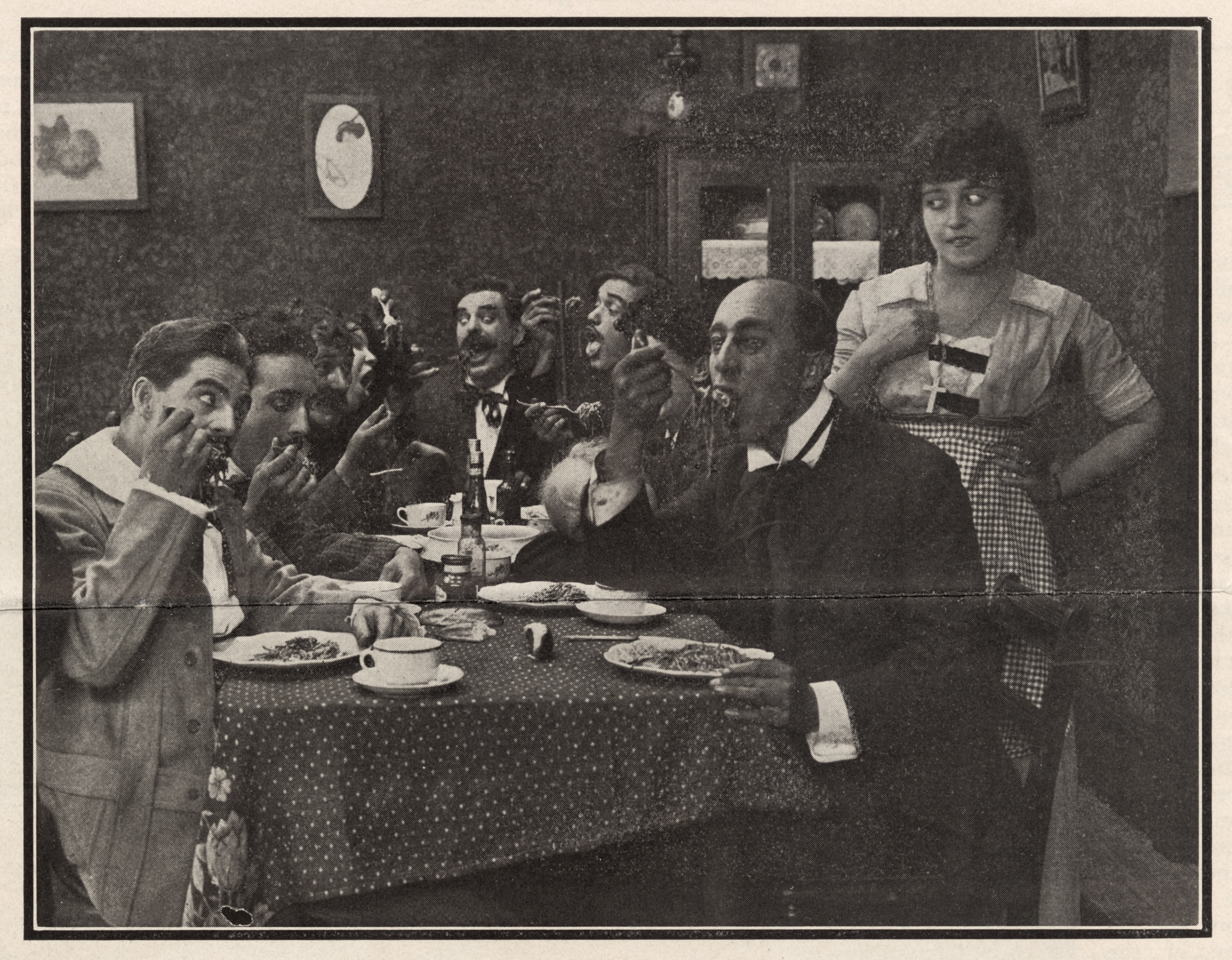
- Frances Ne Moyer and the cast in a publicity still from The Dead Letter
- Directed by: Will Louis
- Written by: Fred H. Hayn
- Produced by: Arthur Hotaling
- Starring: Oliver Hardy
- Release date: August 17, 1915
- Country: United States
- Languages: Silent film English intertitles

The Dead Letter is a 1915 American silent comedy film starring Oliver Hardy. It was on a split reel with Persistent Dalton, a cartoon comedy.

== Plot ==
This plot summary appeared in The New York Dramatic Mirror on August 25, 1915:

An Italian wants his love letter back, a letter which he had failed to address. The postman, who is just collecting it, tells his friend he will have to call at the dead letter office for it. Mr. Luigi promptly calls at the morgue, only to be redirected to the proper place. The circumstance is the wooing of an Italian boarding-house keeper by two Italians, various complications finally deciding the girl for neither of them, but for the arms of a boarder in the house.

One reviewer took exception to the ethnic stereotyping:

As long as slapstick rules the comedy game, we must have these silly stories caricaturing all sorts cf nationalities. In this release "[derogatory term for Italians]" do the running about with the inevitable cop at their heels. The organ grinder and the ice cream cone man fight over the landlady, who is won by the star boarder. The letter that gives the comedy its name is called for at the morgue instead of the dead letter office by Luigi

== Cast ==
- Oliver Hardy as Mateo (as Babe Hardy)
- Frances Ne Moyer as Lena Pula
- Vincente DePascale as Luigi
- C. W. Ritchie as Emelio (as Charles Ritchie)

== See also ==
- List of American films of 1915
- Oliver Hardy filmography
