= A Lucky Strike =

1915 film

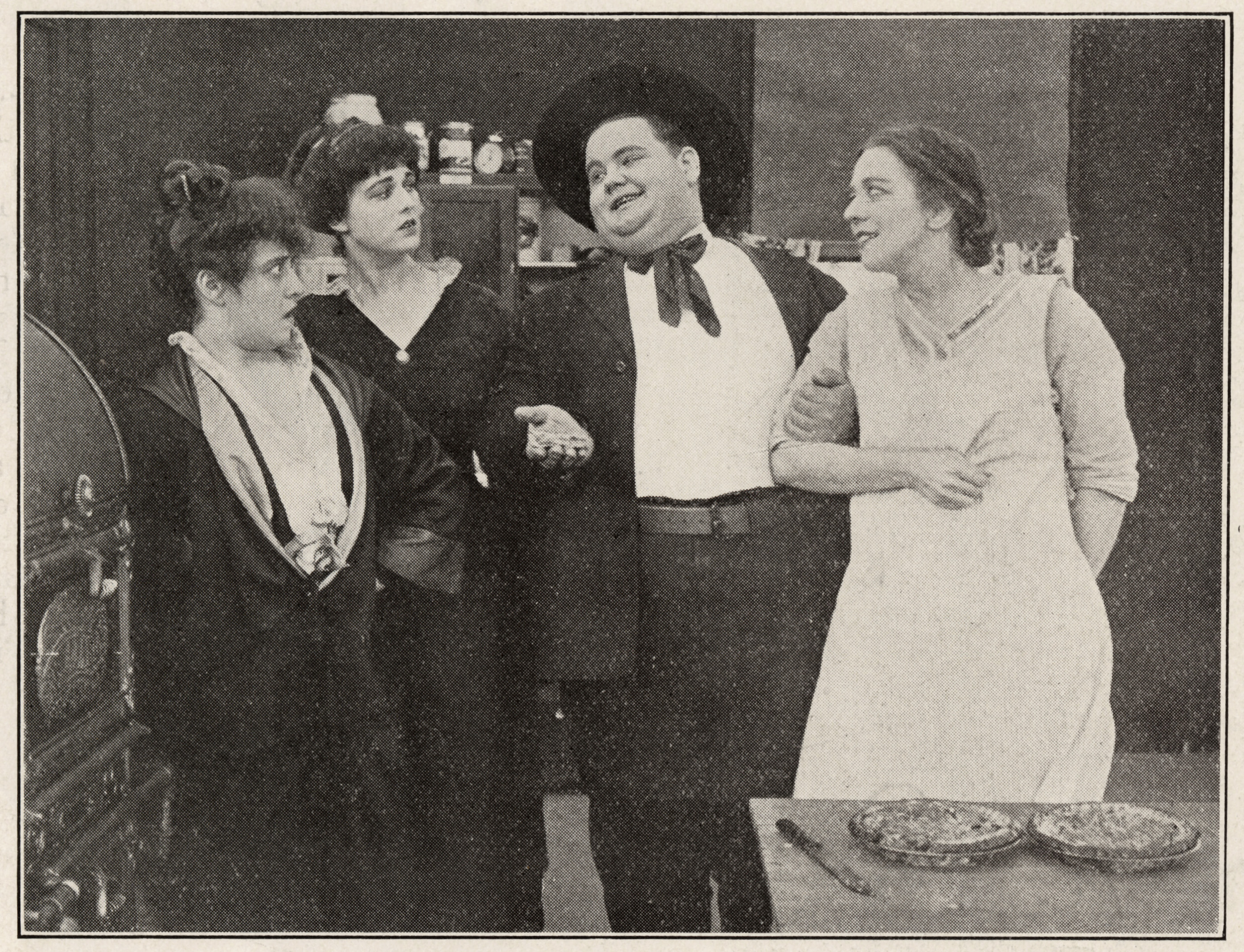
- Frances Ne Moyer, Cora Walker, Oliver Hardy, and Mae Hotely in a publicity still from A Lucky Strike
- Directed by: Arthur Hotaling
- Written by: Arthur Hotaling
- Produced by: Arthur Hotaling
- Starring: Mae Hotely
- Release date: May 18, 1915
- Country: United States
- Languages: Silent film English intertitles

A Lucky Strike (1915)

A Lucky Strike is a 1915 American film featuring Oliver Hardy.

== Plot ==
This plot synopsis appeared in The Moving Picture World for the week of May 15, 1915:

"Bill" Meyers, a rich miner, longs for a home and a wife, and inserts an ad. in an Eastern newspaper. Nellie Crehan and her niece, Elinor, see the ad. and, in a spirit of fun, decide to answer it. The letter arrives, together with an offer from an Eastern firm making Bill an offer of a million dollars for his mine. Bill has visions of a happy home and a life of contentment. Both letters are from the same city, and Bill decides to answer them in person. Arrived at the firm's office he begins negotiations for the sale of the mine, and hurries away to seek the writer of the other letter, before completing the sale.

Arriving at the house he informs them who he is. The aunt and niece decide to carry the joke further and to have Nora, the cook, pose as the writer of the letter and the mistress. Nora reluctantly consents and is dressed for the part. She receives Bill, who is favorably impressed and who proposes at once. He is promised an answer that afternoon. Gray and Vincent, the financiers, wishing to close the contract, which Bill had forgotten for the time, trace him to the house. The aunt, dressed as the maid, admits them. Securing Bill's signature to the contract, they hand him a check for a million dollars, much to the surprise of Nora, and to the chagrin of the aunt and niece who have been overhearing all.

Realizing the opportunity she has lost, the aunt indignantly exposes Nora's identity and dismisses her to the kitchen. Having truly fallen in love with Nora, Bill refuses to believe that she is the cook. To convince him they take him to the kitchen where Nora is at work. Seeing a freshly baked pie, Bill helps himself to a slice and is delighted with it. He decides that whoever can bake a pie like that shall be his wife. He asks Nelle if it was she who baked the pie and she scornfully denies it, and points to Nora. Bill is delighted, proposes and is accepted.

== Cast ==
- Mae Hotely as Nora, the Cook
- Oliver Hardy as Bill Myers
- Cora Walker as Nelle Crehan
- Frances Ne Moyer as Elinor, her niece
- Jerold T. Hevener as Thomas Gray
- Ed Lawrence as His Assistant
- Raymond McKee as Clerk
- Ben Walker as Clerk

== See also ==
- List of American films of 1915
- Oliver Hardy filmography
