= Matilda's Legacy =

1915 film

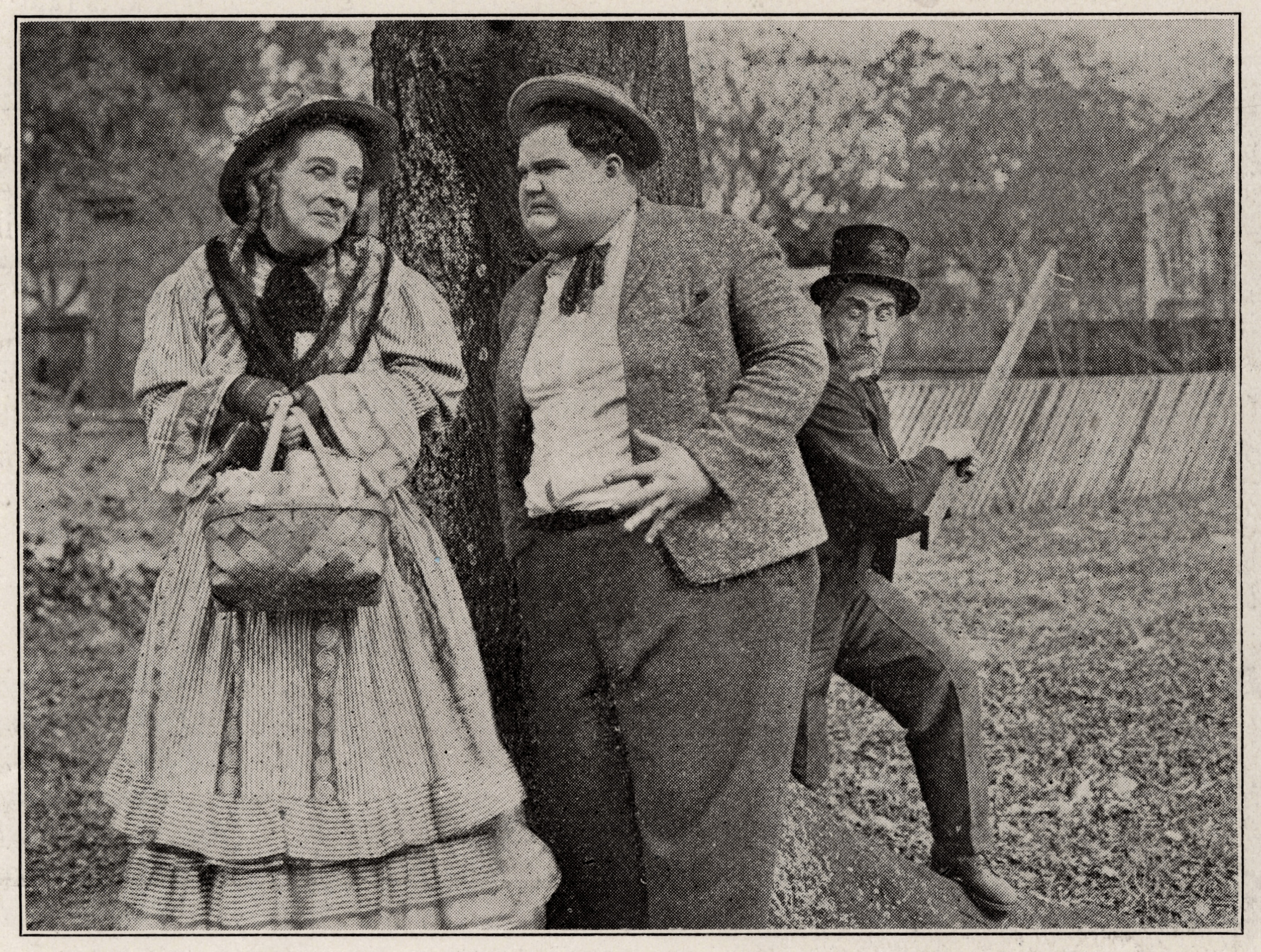
- Mae Hotely and Oliver Hardy in a publicity still from Matilda's Legacy
- Directed by: Arthur Hotaling
- Written by: Arthur Hotaling
- Produced by: Arthur Hotaling
- Starring: Mae Hotely
- Release date: May 18, 1915
- Running time: 1 reel
- Country: United States
- Languages: Silent film English intertitles

Matilda's Legacy is a 1915 American lost silent comedy film featuring Oliver Hardy.

== Plot ==
This plot comes from The Moving Picture World for May 22, 1915:

Fatty and Stubbs are rivals for the hand of Kitty, the village belle. Fatty comes upon Stubbs making ardent love to Kitty. A fight ensues in which a board, thrown at Fatty, misses him, and hits Si Dewberry, the Justice of the Peace. Si becomes enraged and gives pursuit. He spies a head protruding from behind a tree. Thinking it is Fatty's, he smashes it with the board. By mistake he has hit Matilda Honeysuckle, the unpopular old maid of the village. Old Seth Perkins happens along in time to render aid to Matilda and to care for her wounds.

Seth's niece discovers a letter belonging to Matilda, in which she is informed that Matilda has fallen heir to a fortune. She spreads this news to the widowers and bachelors of the village. The entire male population of the village begin a conquest for the old maid's heart, and rush to her home with presents. About this tfme, Seth happens along, looks in the window, sizes up the situation, and decides to defeat the others. Ho hurries off to the telegraph station and persuades the operator to write him a fake telegram, stating that it was all a mistake about Matilda's inheritance. This he take's back to the house and gives to Matilda. Upon reading it she faints and her "gallant lovers" decide it is no place for them and beat a hasty retreat, leaving Seth and Matilda alone. Seth loses no time in reviving Matilda, and in explaining that he faked up the telegram to test the loyalty of her suitors. Seth proposes and is willingly accepted.

== Cast ==
- Mae Hotely as Matilda Honeysuckle
- Ed Lawrence as Seth Perkins
- Jerold T. Hevener as Si Dewberry
- Oliver Hardy as Fatty Waite

== See also ==
- List of American films of 1915
- Oliver Hardy filmography
