= She Was the Other =

1914 film

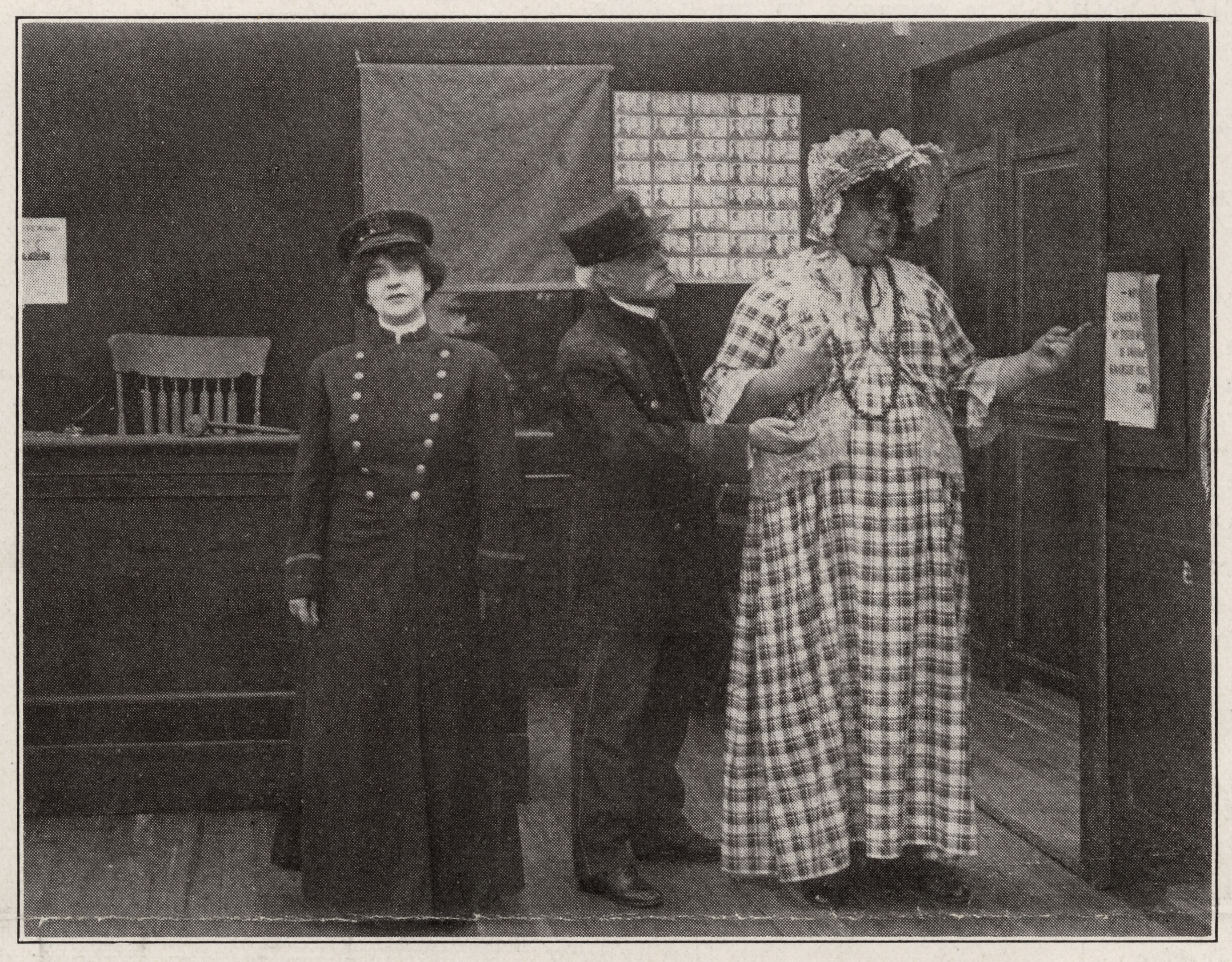
- Mabel Paige, Ed Lawrence, and "Babe" Hardy in a publicity still from She Was the Other
- Directed by: Arthur Hotaling
- Written by: Epes W. Sargent
- Produced by: Arthur Hotaling
- Starring: Ed Lawrence; Oliver Hardy; Mabel Paige
- Release date: November 17, 1914
- Running time: c. 5 minutes (400 feet)
- Country: United States
- Languages: Silent film English intertitles

She Was the Other is a 1914 American split-reel silent comedy film produced by the Lubin Manufacturing Company and starring Ed Lawrence, Oliver Hardy, and Mabel Paige.

== Plot ==
The chief of police is tired of the sloppy appearance of his officers. A nearby police department has solved this problem by appointing a female inspector, so the chief decides to do the same, and he tells the men that his sister will be joining the department and inspecting them on Monday. The men are familiar with his fat sister Cutie and have no desire to look their best for her, so they show up to work in an even more disheveled state than usual. The inspector, however, turns out to be the chief's other sister, Helen, who is very attractive. When they see her, the embarrassed men run out of the station and return all spruced up.

== Cast ==
- Ed Lawrence - The Chief
- Oliver Hardy - Cutie (billed as Babe Hardy)
- Mabel Paige - Helen

== Production and reception ==
She Was the Other was written by Epes W. Sargent and produced and directed by Arthur Hotaling, who was the general supervisor of the Jacksonville, Florida unit of the Lubin Manufacturing Company of Philadelphia. It was a short split-reel comedy, lasting approximately five minutes and sharing a single reel of film with Cheap Transportation, an unrelated comedy starring, written and directed by Frank C. Griffin. The films were released by the General Film Company on November 17, 1914, and are among a group of short comedies made by the Lubin company in 1914 and early 1915 that include the earliest screen appearances of Oliver Hardy. Rob Stone points out that this is the first film in which Hardy played the role of a woman (as opposed to a man disguised as a woman). A promotional still in the Lubin Bulletin shows Hardy dressed in an oversized checked cotton dress with a floral bonnet.

The film received generally favorable reviews in the trade papers. Moving Picture World described it as "interesting and amusing" and "a comedy that is quite original in conception", while Motion Picture News called it "a fairly amusing story". The Bioscope singled out Hardy's performance for special notice, describing the film as "an amusing little tale" and writing that "Babe Hardy is irresistably funny as Cutey, the fat sister of the station super". The critic for the New York Dramatic Mirror was less impressed: "E. W. Sargent probably wrote this burlesque on the spur of the moment to keep Lubin's knockabout police force busy. It suggests hasty preparation on the poart of both scenario writer and director."

== See also ==
- List of American films of 1914
- Oliver Hardy filmography
