= Mabel Paige =

American actress

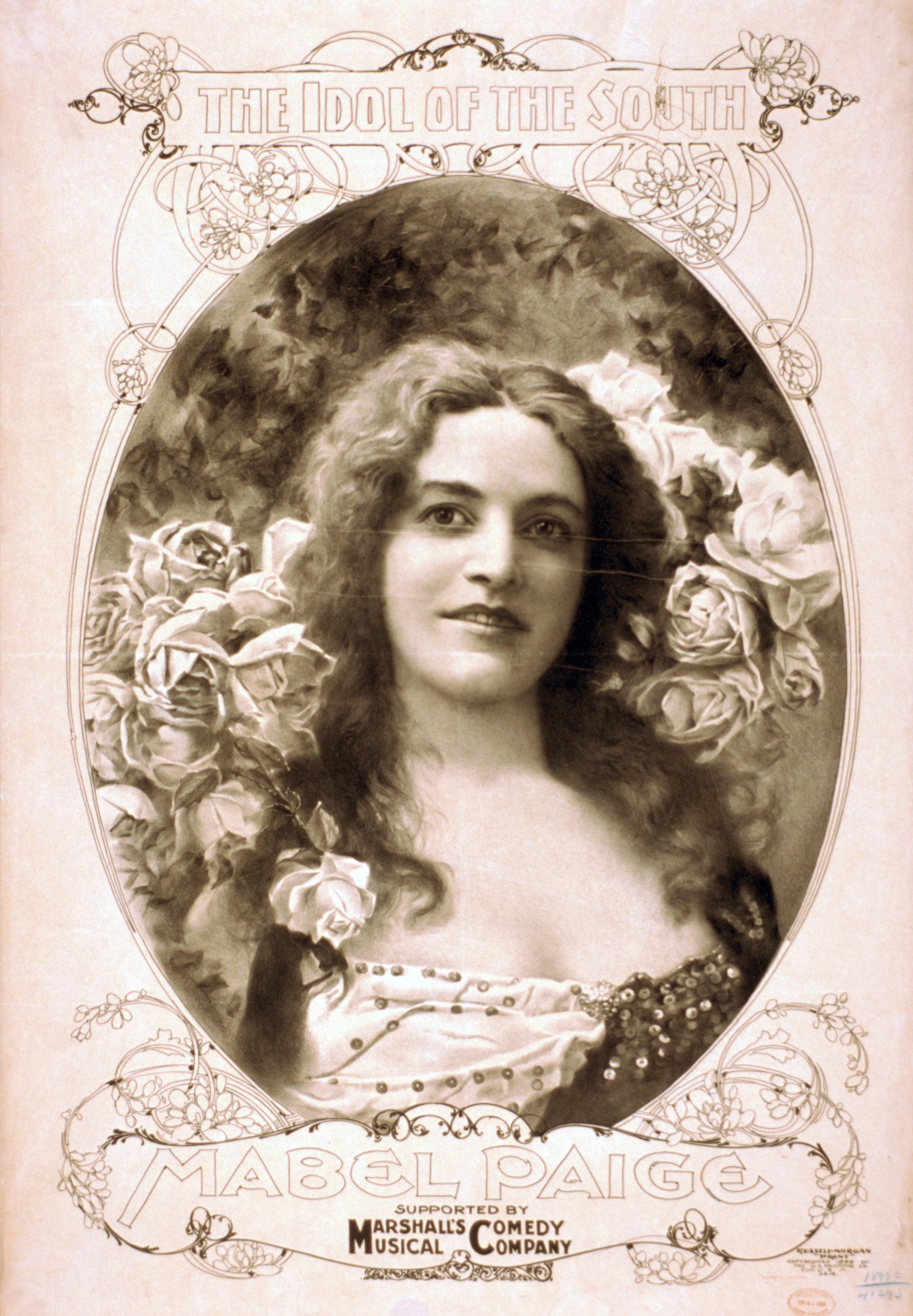
- Mabel Paige, "The Idol of the South", 1899
- Born: Mabel Paige Roberts; December 19, 1880; New York, New York, U.S.
- Died: February 9, 1954 (aged 73); Van Nuys, California, U.S.
- Years active: 1914-1953
- Spouse: Charles W. Ritchie (m. 1908; died 1931)

Mabel Paige (December 19, 1880 – February 9, 1954) was an American stage and film actress.

== Early years ==
Paige was born in New York City. She began acting at age four, when she appeared in Van, the Virginian. Her parents were vaudevillians Frank Roberts and Doris Paige Roberts.

== Career ==
When she was 11 years old, Paige began acting in stock theater. She appeared in dozens of stage plays, including Little Lord Fauntleroy in 1892, Rip van Winkle in 1899, and At Cozy Corners in 1905. In the South, she became particular a favorite and was acclaimed as the Idol of the South. Her Mabel Paige Theatrical Company toured the region for many years. She also had troupes known as the Mabel Paige Repertoire Company and the Mabel Paige Southern Company.

After she married, Paige left acting to raise her family. She was away from show business for more than a decade, but financial problems prompted her to return to acting.

Paige acted in more than 50 films between 1914 and 1953. In her first silent films for the Lubin Company, she co-starred in romantic comedies with Oliver Hardy as her leading man. Her Broadway credits included Gramercy Ghost (1951), Two Blind Mice (1949), Out of the Frying Pan (1941), Western Waters (1937), Murder in the Cathedral (1936), and Lost Horizons (1934).

One of Paige's last appearances as an actress was on the CBS-TV sitcom I Love Lucy. That episode, "The Girls Go Into Business", aired on October 12, 1953.

== Death ==
Paige died in Van Nuys, California from a heart attack on February 9, 1954. She was 74.

== Selected filmography ==
- Back to the Farm (1914)
- A Fool There Was (1914)
- The Soubrette and the Simp (1914)
- She Was the Other (1914)
- The Servant Girl's Legacy (1914)
- Shoddy the Tailor (1915)
- Mixed Flats (1915)
- Capturing Bad Bill (1915)
- Avenging Bill (1915)
- The Crazy Clock Maker (1915)
- It Happened in Pikesville (1916)
- Lucky Jordan (1942)
- Freedom Comes High (1943)
- The Good Fellows (1943)
- Young and Willing (1943)
- ’’Someone to Remember’’ (1943)
- The National Barn Dance (1944)
- Murder, He Says (1945)
- Behind Green Lights (1946)
- Nocturne (1946)
- Johnny O'Clock (1947)
- Her Husband's Affairs (1947)
- The Mating of Millie (1948)
- Half Past Midnight (1948)
- Canon City (1948)
- Hollow Triumph (1948)
- Johnny Belinda (1948)
- Edge of Doom (1950)
- The Sniper (1952)
- Houdini (1953)

== Television appearances ==
- I Love Lucy, episode #68 (1953), "The Girls Go Into Business", as Mrs. Hansen.
- Annie Oakley (1954) Episode #7 titled "A Gal For Grandma," as Mrs. Frances Randall
