= Her Choice (1915 film) =

1915 film

- Directed by: Albert G. Price
- Written by: Albert G. Price
- Produced by: Arthur Hotaling
- Starring: Mae Hotely
- Release date: May 29, 1915
- Country: United States
- Languages: Silent film English intertitles

Her Choice is a 1915 American silent comedy film featuring Oliver Hardy.

== Plot ==
This plot summary comes from The Moving Picture World of June 26, 1915:

The love affair of Betty and Harry is progressing smoothly, when Count Lamont. who is a favorite of her father, appears, and father immediately tries to discourage Harry and to supplant him with the Count. Betty's mother does not favor this, for she has introduced Lord Chase, and it is her intention to encourage a match between Betty and . him. Betty and Harry are temporarily discomfited, but Harry gets an idea and the lovers start to carry it into execution. She writes a note to the Count and one to the Lord asking each of them to come to a meeting place at a late hour and to be dressed as a woman, and that neither must speak a word but to proceed to the minister's to be wedded. Each telephones to the parent who has been his particular ally, and tells of the planned elopement.

The father and mother are delighted and they take no apparent notice of Betty when she makes an excuse to go out to a friend's for a few minutes. Harry is waiting and they are whisked away in his car to the minister's, where they are married. In the meantime the Count and Lord have disguised and met at the appointed place. They in turn hurry to the minister's and arrive before the young couple has departed. The young folks hide and the others are - admitted. The wedding is interrupted by both of the parties producing rinjs and the minister whisks off their hats and exposes their identity. They leave in disgust and hurry to the parents who meet them with surprise, but when all is explained and the young lovers enter and tell their story they are forgiven.

== Cast ==
- Mae Hotely as Mrs. Stern
- Ed Lawrence as Mr. Stern
- Raymond McKee as Harry
- Jerold T. Hevener as Count Lamont
- Ben Walker as Lord Chase
- Oliver Hardy (as Babe Hardy)

== See also ==
- List of American films of 1915
