= Baby (1915 film) =

1915 film

- Directed by: Harry Myers
- Written by: Samuel Greiner
- Starring: Harry Myers
- Release date: May 17, 1915
- Country: United States
- Languages: Silent film English intertitles

Baby is a 1915 American silent comedy film featuring Oliver Hardy.

== Plot ==
This plot summary appeared in The Moving Picture World for May 15, 1915:

Breakfast is ready and the wife patiently awaits her husband, who is shaving. While shaving he thinks of his baby and leaves his shaving to play with the baby. The wife calls him and the husband rushes back to his shaving and is so startled upon hearing the angry tones of his wife that he cuts himself. Finally he comes down. Everything is cold, but he doesn't care.

He is in such a hurry to get to the office that he fails to kiss his wife goodby. At the office his manager is angered beyond words at Harry's non-appearance. Presently the door opens and Harry enters. The manager, Mr. Vale, scolds him. Harry tells him of his baby. Mr. Vale, in absolute disgust, goes to his desk. While absorbed in work, Harry takes his baby's photo, sees a vision of his wife and laughs aloud. Mr. Vale, annoyed, glares him back into his seat. The next day Harry's wife decides to cure him and telephones him to noon home for the day. He returns at noon, he encounters many queer looking people entering his home. His wife selects one of the women. The husband rushes into the house and wife tells him she is the maid for fear of the baby. He fires her, but wife commands her to stay. He disinfects the maid for fear of contamination. At work again, he sees wild visions of the maid spanking the baby. In the midst of his work he rushes home only to find the baby all right. So overjoyed is he that he was mistaken that he remains at home playing with the baby until Mr. Vale 'phones him and says if he doesn't come back immediately he can look for another job.

That evening his wife arranges him to meet her at the theater. Upon his arriving at home, the baby again takes up his time, and he forgets completely about his wife, who, after waiting until 9 o'clock, goes home wild. She tells him that unless he leaves the baby alone entirely, she will leave him. He does not believe this, but when the maid informs him that his wife is packing, he rushes to her and promises. He lives up to his promise, never to enter the baby's room, but is so ill, that he cannot eat, or sleep. One night he crawls to the baby's room. His wife awakens and follows him. Instead of the scolding, which he thinks he shall get, she whispers in his ear, and they joyously exit. Several days later, he is telephoned by the manager that Harry is wanted home "by three." Thinking of course she means three o'clock, he explains to the clerks, that his wife is expecting a new baby, and cheerfully exits. Upon arriving at home and going to his wife's bedside, he finds instead of one new baby, three of them. He falls out of the window.

Later, on May 22, 1915, this shorter version appeared:

A two-reel comedy number, by Harry C. Myers, in which he and Rosemary Theby enact the part of newlyweds. The young father is pasionately fond of the baby and neglects his work from thinking of it. Later in the story he is blessed with triplets. For a comedy with a slight plot this proves very artistic and entertaining. The settings are attractive and the title drawings are pleasing.

== Cast ==
- Harry Myers as Harry the Husband
- Rosemary Theby as Rosemary the Wife
- Oliver Hardy
- Mae Hotely

== See also ==
- List of American films of 1915
