= Mae Hotely =

American actress

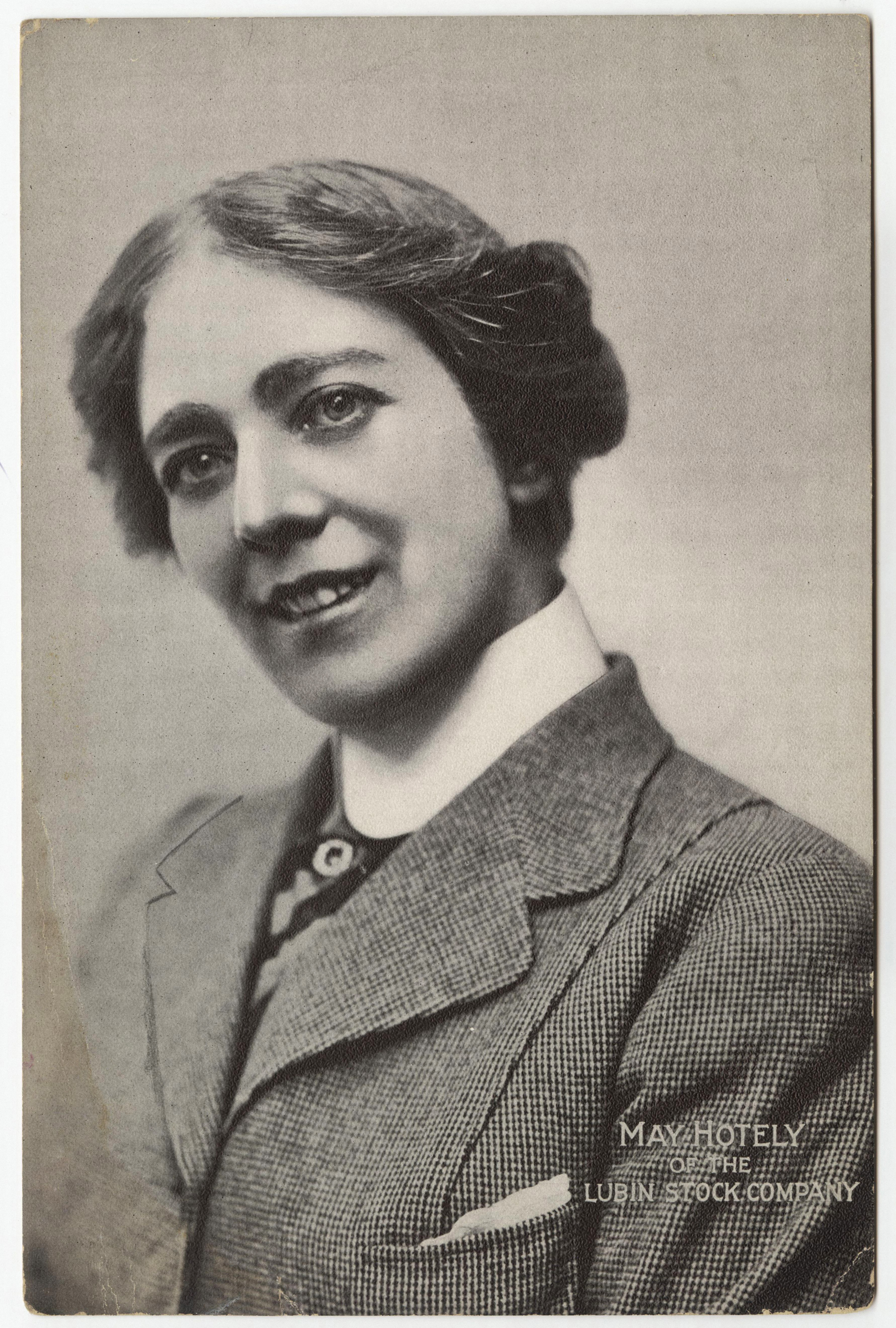
- Mae Hotely, ca. 1915
- Born: October 7, 1872; Maryland, US
- Died: April 6, 1954 (aged 81); Coronado, California, US
- Years active: 1911–1929
- Spouse: Arthur Hotaling (married 1902, later divorced)

Mae Hotely (October 7, 1872 – April 6, 1954) was an American silent film actress. She was in Lubin comedy films. She appeared in more than 80 films between 1911 and 1929. Born in Maryland as Maye Shearor, in August 1902 she married the film director Arthur Hotaling, creating her stage name as a play on his.

She worked for Lubin Company at its Jacksonville, Florida studio. She died in Coronado, California.

== Selected filmography ==
- Her Choice (1915)
- Matilda's Legacy (1915)
- A Lucky Strike (1915)
- Baby (1915)
- The Twin Sister (1915)
- What He Forgot (1915)
- Who's Boss? (1914)
- Long May It Wave (1914)
- The Female Cop (1914)
- Building a Fire (1914)
- Casey's Birthday (1914)
