= Arthur Hotaling =

American film director (1873–1938)

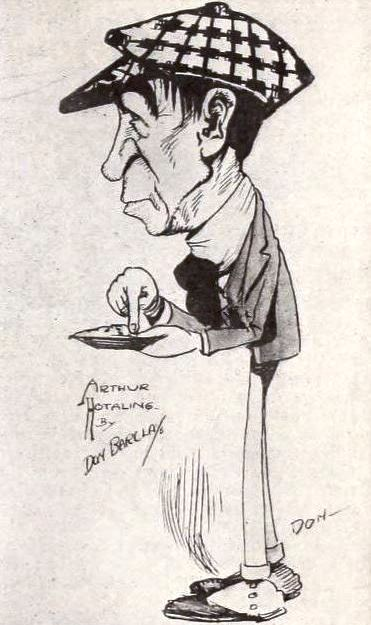
- Sketch of Hotaling "explaining the gentle art of throwing a custard pie"
- Born: February 3, 1873; New York City
- Died: July 13, 1938 (aged 65); California, USA
- Occupation: Film director
- Years active: 1910–1928

Arthur Douglas Hotaling (February 3, 1873 – July 13, 1938) was an American film director, producer and writer. He directed 113 films between 1910 and 1928, including the 1914 film Outwitting Dad, which featured the onscreen debut of Oliver Hardy.

Hotaling was born in New York City. He would later go to work for the Lubin Manufacturing Company. Hotaling and Siegmund Lubin were reportedly very close, with Hotaling considered Lubin's "boy wonder". In 1912, Hotaling brought a company of actors to Jacksonville, Florida, where he established a film studio for Lublin. During his time with the Lubin Company, he saw it develop from a one-man studio to a multimillion-dollar company. Hotaling would work with Lublin for 18 years.

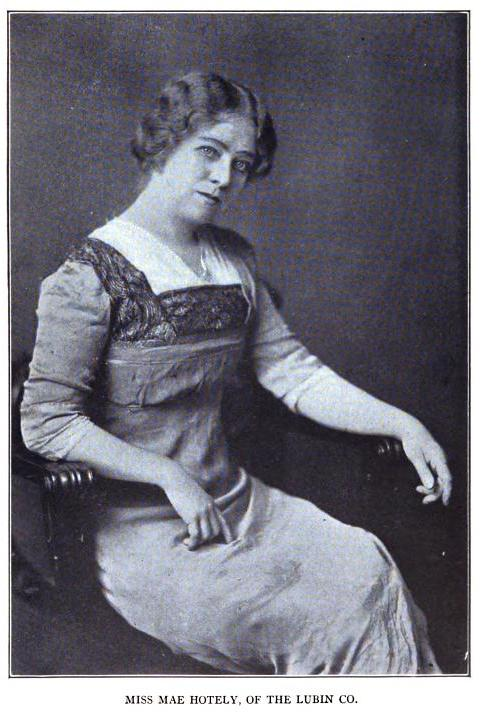
Mae Hotely, Hotaling's wife

In August 1902, Hotaling married Maye Shearor who became the silent film actress Mae Hotely, her stage name was a play on his name. She appeared in some of his films and acted in some of them. The couple later divorced.

Hotaling died in California from a heart attack.

Contemporary film historians analyzing Hotaling's work have found racist ideology in many of his Florida films, where they use stereotypes featuring minstrels and mammys.

== Selected filmography ==
As a director:

- Rastus in Zululand (1910)
- The Missing Jewels (1913)
- Outwitting Dad (1914)
- He Won a Ranch (1914)
- The Particular Cowboys (1914)
- For Two Pins (1914)
- Coon Town Suffragettes (1914)
- She Was the Other (1914)
- The Servant Girl's Legacy (1914)
- The Twin Sister (1915)
- A Lucky Strike (1915)
- Matilda's Legacy (1915)
- A Ready-Made Maid (1916)
- A Gentleman Preferred (1928)

As an actor:

- With Kit Carson Over the Great Divide (1925)
- King of the Herd (1927)
- The Little Wild Girl (1928)
- Old Age Handicap (1928)

As writer:

- A Day on the Force
