= The Fresh Air Cure =

1914 film

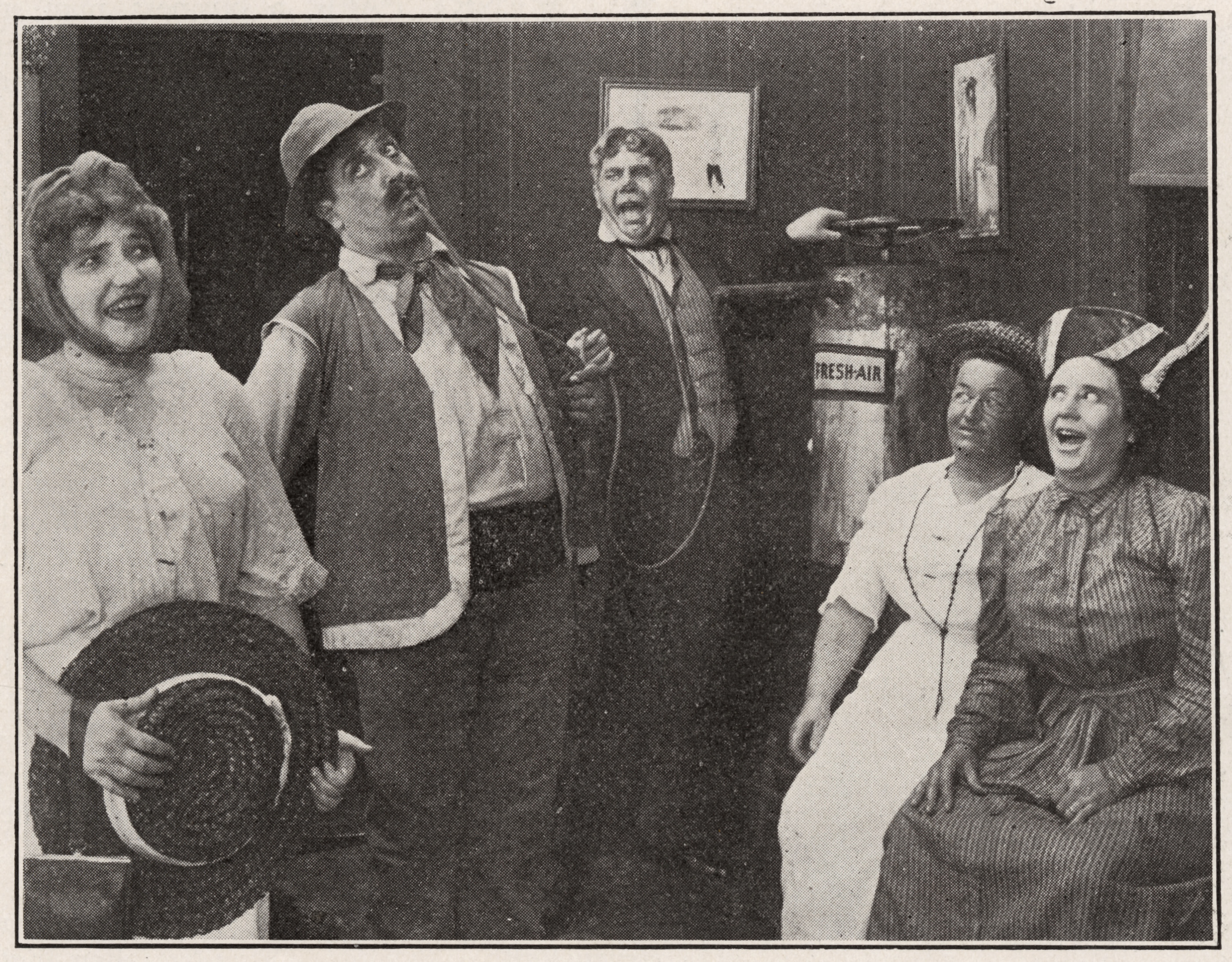
- Publicity still for The Fresh Air Cure
- Written by: Doty Hobart
- Produced by: Arthur Hotaling
- Starring: Vincente DePascale; Eva Bell; Oliver Hardy; Bert Tracy
- Release date: December 12, 1914
- Running time: ca. 8 minutes (600 feet)
- Country: United States
- Languages: Silent film English intertitles

The Fresh Air Cure is a 1914 American split-reel silent comedy film produced by the Lubin Manufacturing Company and starring Vincent DePascale, Eva Bell, Oliver Hardy, and Bert Tracy.

== Plot ==
The following plot summary appeared in Motography magazine in December 1914:

Tony is advised by Mr. Strong, a fresh air enthusiast, to sleep out doors, but having no sleeping porch he is forced to set up his bed in the street, much to the disgust of Anne, his daughter. Anne elopes with Izzy Silverstein, the son of his enemy. Tony and Izzy's father both give chase but the young people escape and Tony returns to bed. Izzy and Anne are safely married and return home for the parental blessing just in time to see Tony's open air bedroom hit by an automobile. Rushing to the wreck they rescue Tony and receive his blessing.

== Cast ==
- Vincente DePascale as Tony Stilletto
- Eva Bell as Anna Stilletto
- Oliver Hardy as Morris Silverstein (billed as Babe Hardy)
- Bert Tracy as Izzy Silverstein (billed as Herbert Tracy)
- Royal Byron as Mr. Strong
- Billy Bowers as Pat McFlarrathy

== Production and reception ==
The Fresh Air Cure was written by Doty Hobart and produced by Arthur Hotaling, the general supervisor of the Jacksonville, Florida unit of the Lubin Manufacturing Company of Philadelphia. It was a short split-reel comedy, lasting approximately eight minutes and sharing a single reel of film with Sam and the Bully, an unrelated comedy written by Epes W. Sargent and starring John and Mattie Edwards. (In the UK, Sam and the Bully was replaced by Love and Title.) The films were released by the General Film Company on December 12, 1914, and are among a group of short comedies made by the Lubin company in 1914 and early 1915 that include the earliest screen appearances of Oliver Hardy. Although Sam and the Bully has survived, no copy of The Fresh Air Cure is known to exist.

The film received generally positive reviews in the trade papers. Moving Picture World described it as "A boisterous comedy ... a burlesque on the "sleep out of doors thing." It is funny to view the avalanche of trouble the author and director have hatched up for the people in the cast, who handle it bravely." The reviewer for The Bioscope called it "a good, brisk comic, with some very amusing trick effects during a chase after the bedstead containing the man who wanted fresh air."

According to Rob Stone, the censors in Ohio ordered that the title of the film be changed to Fresh Air Camp, apparently in order to avoid any allusion to alcohol.

== See also ==
- List of American films of 1914
- Oliver Hardy filmography
