= Jealous James =

1914 film

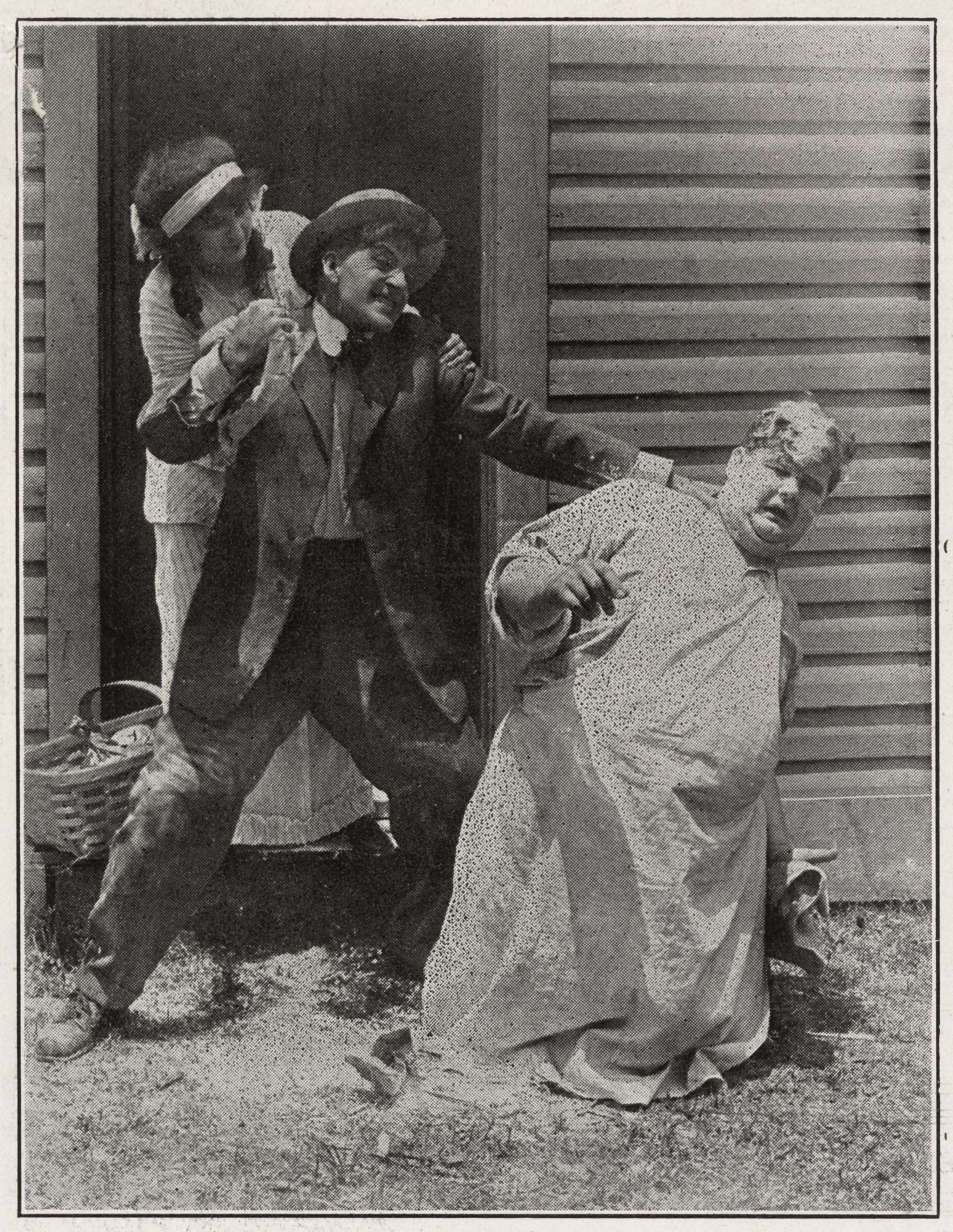
- Marguerite Ne Moyer, Jerold Hevener, and "Babe" Hardy in a publicity still from Jealous James
- Written by: Epes W. Sargent
- Produced by: Arthur Hotaling
- Starring: Jerold T. Hevener; Marguerite Ne Moyer
- Release date: September 29, 1914
- Running time: 6–7 minutes (c. 600 feet)
- Country: United States
- Languages: Silent film English intertitles

Jealous James is a 1914 American silent comedy film produced by the Lubin Manufacturing Company and starring Jerold T. Hevener and Marguerite Ne Moyer, with Bert Tracy, Raymond McKee, and Oliver Hardy.

== Plot ==
Jim Jenkins is a jealous husband; every time he sees his wife with another man (the grocery boy, a workman installing a carpet) he assumes the worst. After he shoots at a man who turns out to be a neighbor girl dressed in a costume, the girl's brother arranges for prizefighter to cure him of his jealousy.

== Cast ==
- Jerold T. Hevener as Jim Jenkins
- Marguerite Ne Moyer as Clara Jenkins
- Eva Bell as Maude Mullen
- Bert Tracy as Sam (billed as Herbert Tracy)
- Raymond McKee as Harry
- Oliver Hardy as Grocery Boy (uncredited)

== Production and reception ==
Jealous James was written by Epes W. Sargent and produced in Jacksonville, Florida, at the Jacksonville unit of the Lubin Manufacturing Company of Philadelphia, under the general supervision of Arthur Hotaling. It was a short split-reel comedy, lasting approximately 6–7 minutes, and sharing a single reel of film with a second, unrelated comedy, Jinks and the Barber, written by J. A. Murphy and starring Harry Lorraine, C. V. Pasquali, Marguerite Ne Moyer, and Billy Bowers. Both films were released by the General Film Company on September 19, 1914. Jealous James was one of a group of short comedies made by the Lubin company in 1914 and early 1915 that include the earliest screen appearances of Oliver Hardy. Hardy is not credited by name in the Lubin company newsletter, but he appears prominently in a promotional still for the film.

The film received mixed reviews in the trade papers. The Bioscope described it as a "fussy, strenuous comedy played upon familiar lines and staged in an effective manner", while the New York Dramatic Mirror wrote "This offering is lifeless and does not show any originality". The critic for Moving Picture World, after summarizing the plot, observed laconically "It creates laughs."

== See also ==
- List of American films of 1914
- Oliver Hardy filmography
