= He Wanted Work =

1914 film

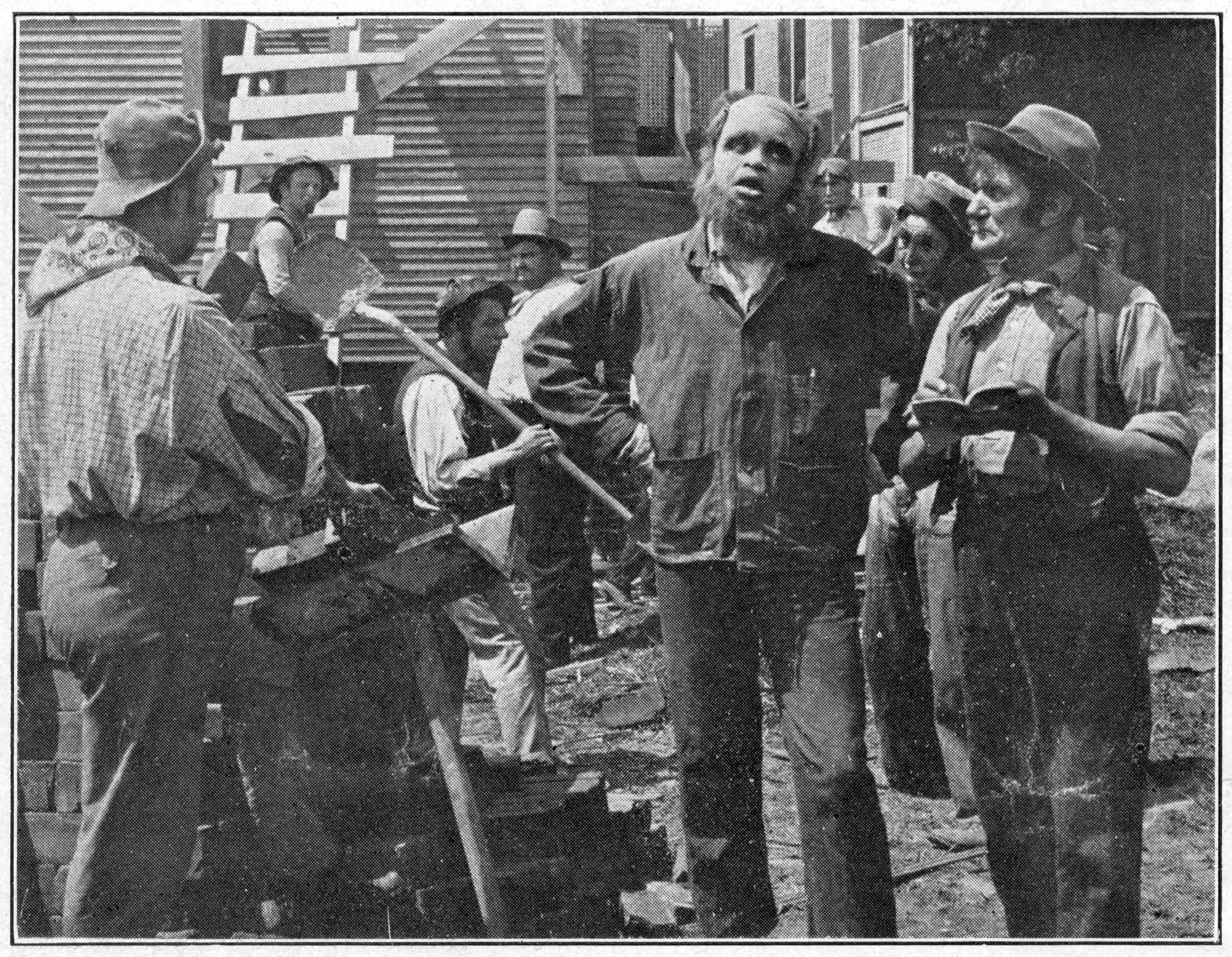
- John Edwards (center) and Billy Bowers (right) in a publicity still from He Wanted Work
- Written by: Epes W. Sargent
- Produced by: Arthur Hotaling
- Starring: John Edwards; Mattie Edwards; Billy Bowers
- Release date: August 11, 1914
- Running time: 5 minutes (c. 400 feet)
- Country: United States
- Language: Silent with English intertitles

He Wanted Work is a lost 1914 American silent comedy film produced by the Lubin Manufacturing Company, featuring John Edwards, Mattie Edwards, Billy Bowers, and Oliver Hardy.

== Plot ==
John Jackson is looking for work. He applies for a job at a construction site, but the Irish workers refuse to work with a Black man and chase him away. John finds an actor's suitcase and uses the makeup and clothing to disguise himself as an Irishman. He gets the job and all goes well until one of the workmen accidentally sprays him with a hose, washing off the white makeup and revealing the trick. The angry workmen bury him under a pile of bricks.

== Cast ==
- John Edwards as John Jackson
- Mattie Edwards as Mandy, his wife
- Billy Bowers as the Boss Builder
- Oliver Hardy as the Foreman (billed as Babe Hardy)

== Production ==
He Wanted Work was filmed in Jacksonville, Florida, at the Jacksonville unit of the Lubin Manufacturing Company, under the general supervision of Arthur Hotaling. It was a short split-reel comedy, lasting approximately 5 minutes, and sharing a single reel of film with a second, unrelated comedy, The Cook Next Door, starring Mae Hotely and Ed Lawrence. The films were released by the General Film Company on August 11, 1914.

He Wanted Work was one of a series of "Colored Comedies" produced by the Lubin studio between 1913 and 1915, starring the African American vaudeville and minstrel show performers John (Junk) Edwards and Mattie Edwards. In this film the rest of the cast consisted of white members of the Lubin stock company in Jacksonville, including the young Oliver Hardy, who played the foreman of the construction crew. (He is visible in the background of a surviving publicity still from the film, which appeared in The Lubin Times, the studio's promotional newsletter.)

The comedy received generally positive reviews in the trade papers. Motion Picture News described it as "a comedy in which John and Matty Edwards again prove their abilities as funmakers"; and Moving Picture World wrote "There is a whole lot of fun in this offering, if it does bear the brand of inconsistency. A colored man makes up as an Irishman to obtain a job. He gets it, and also several other things." The New York Dramatic Mirror noted that "the plot complications of this split reel picture are few, and the methods of achieving laughs far from new or unexpected", but nevertheless concluded that it was "among the welcome comedies".

== See also ==
- List of American films of 1914
- Oliver Hardy filmography
