= Marie Rainford =

American film actress

Marie Rainford was an American film actress.

She appeared in A Prize Package (1912), directed by Siegmund Lubin and starring Eleanor Caines, Jerold T. Hevener and Jack Barrymore; and The Decoy (1914), starring Charles Horan.

== Filmography ==
- Shep's Race with Death (1914) as Mrs. Stearns
- The Touch of a Little Hand (1914) as Ruth's Mother
- The Final Test (1914) as Mary's Mother
- The Master Hand (1914)
- Sis (1914) as Aunt
- His Winning Way (1914) as Ma
- The Keeper of the Light (1914) as George's Mother
- The Belle of the School (1914) as Mrs. Elting
- The Decoy (1914) as Vincent's wife
- The Toy Shop (1914)
- A Telephone Strategy (1914)
- A Circus Romance (1914) as The Fortune Teller
- In Her Sleep (1914)
- A Prize Package (1912) as Miss Wiggins
