= A Tango Tragedy =

1914 film

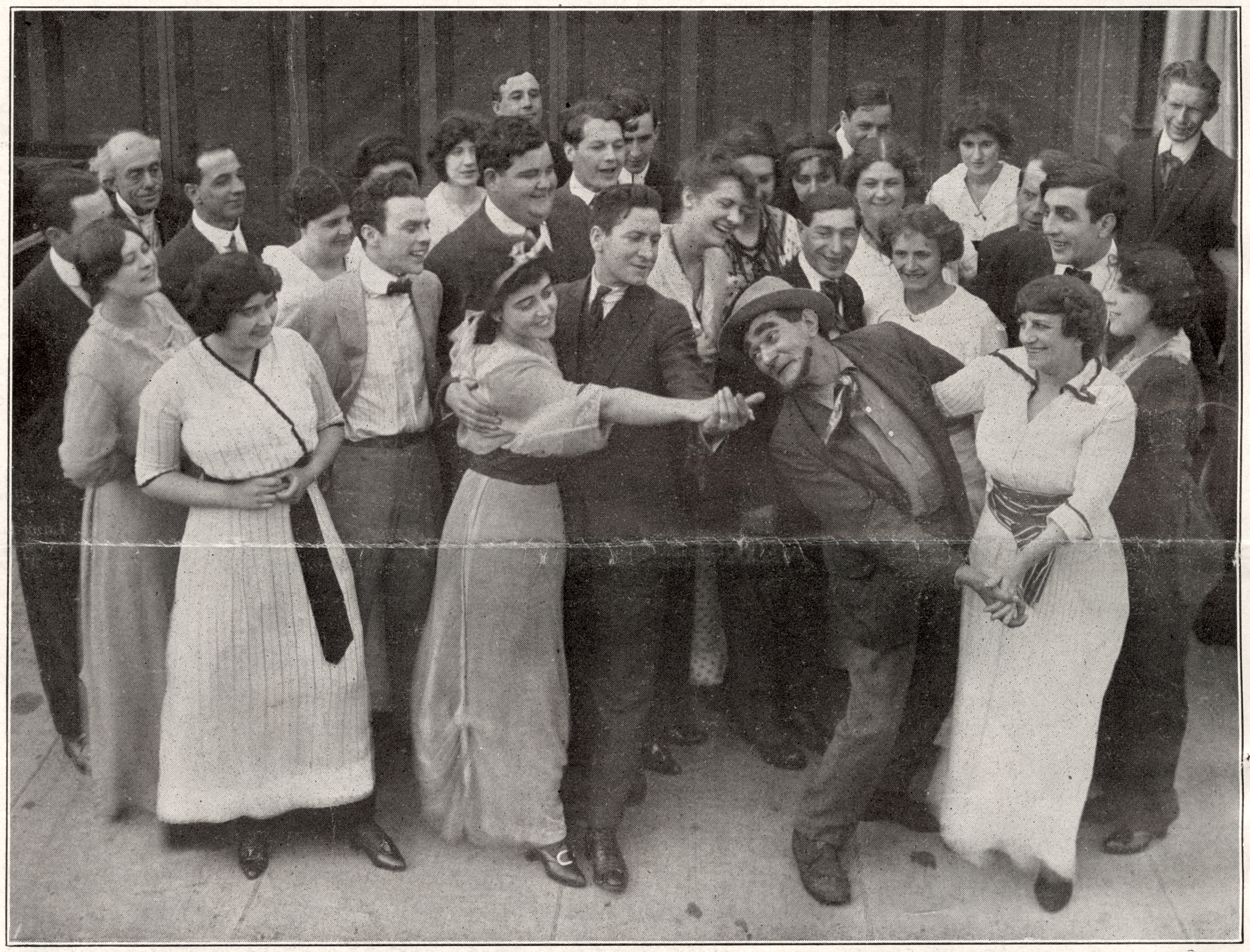
- Publicity still with the cast of A Tango Tragedy (Frances Ne Moyer and James Hodges, center; Billy Bowers and Julia Calhoun, right)
- Written by: Epes W. Sargent
- Produced by: Arthur Hotaling
- Starring: Billy Bowers; Frances Ne Moyer; James Hodges
- Release date: May 30, 1914
- Running time: 5–6 minutes (c. 400 feet)
- Country: United States
- Languages: Silent film English intertitles

A Tango Tragedy is a lost 1914 American silent comedy film produced by the Lubin Manufacturing Company and starring Billy Bowers, Frances Ne Moyer, and James Hodges. Also among the cast was Oliver Hardy, who had a small role as a man at the dance.

== Plot ==
Pat Muldoon disapproves of dancing, and threatens to kill any man who asks his daughter Nora to dance. Undeterred, Dick Kelly invites Nora to a dance, and Pat comes for him with a shotgun. Dick tricks Pat into shooting at a dummy and pretends to be dead. Dressed as a ghost, he commands Pat to dance. The terrified Pat obeys, and discovers that he quite likes dancing with a charming widow. When he sees Dick without his ghost makeup, he wants to fight again, but then the music starts, and faced with the choice between a fight and a tango, Pat chooses the tango, while Dick dances off with Nora.

== Cast ==
- Billy Bowers as Pat Muldoon
- Frances Ne Moyer as Nora Muldoon
- James Hodges as Dick Kelly
- Raymond McKee as Bill Ryan
- Julia Calhoun as The Widow
- Oliver Hardy as a man at the dance (uncredited)

== Production ==
A Tango Tragedy was filmed in Jacksonville, Florida, at the Jacksonville unit of the Lubin Manufacturing Company, under the supervision of Arthur Hotaling. It was a short split-reel comedy, lasting approximately 5–6 minutes, and sharing a single reel of film with a second, unrelated film, in this case the cartoon Circus Time in Toyland by Stewart C. Whitman. The films were released by the General Film Company on May 30, 1914.

A Tango Tragedy is among several Lubin split-reel comedies made in the spring of 1914 that include the earliest screen appearances of Oliver Hardy. In most of these films he was an uncredited extra playing one of a group of cops or cowboys, or, as here, a man at the dance. Although the film itself does not survive, Hardy can be seen looking over James Hodges's shoulder in a promotional still printed in The Lubin Bulletin, the studio's advertising newsletter.

== See also ==
- List of American films of 1914
- Oliver Hardy filmography
