= Cupid's Target =

1915 film

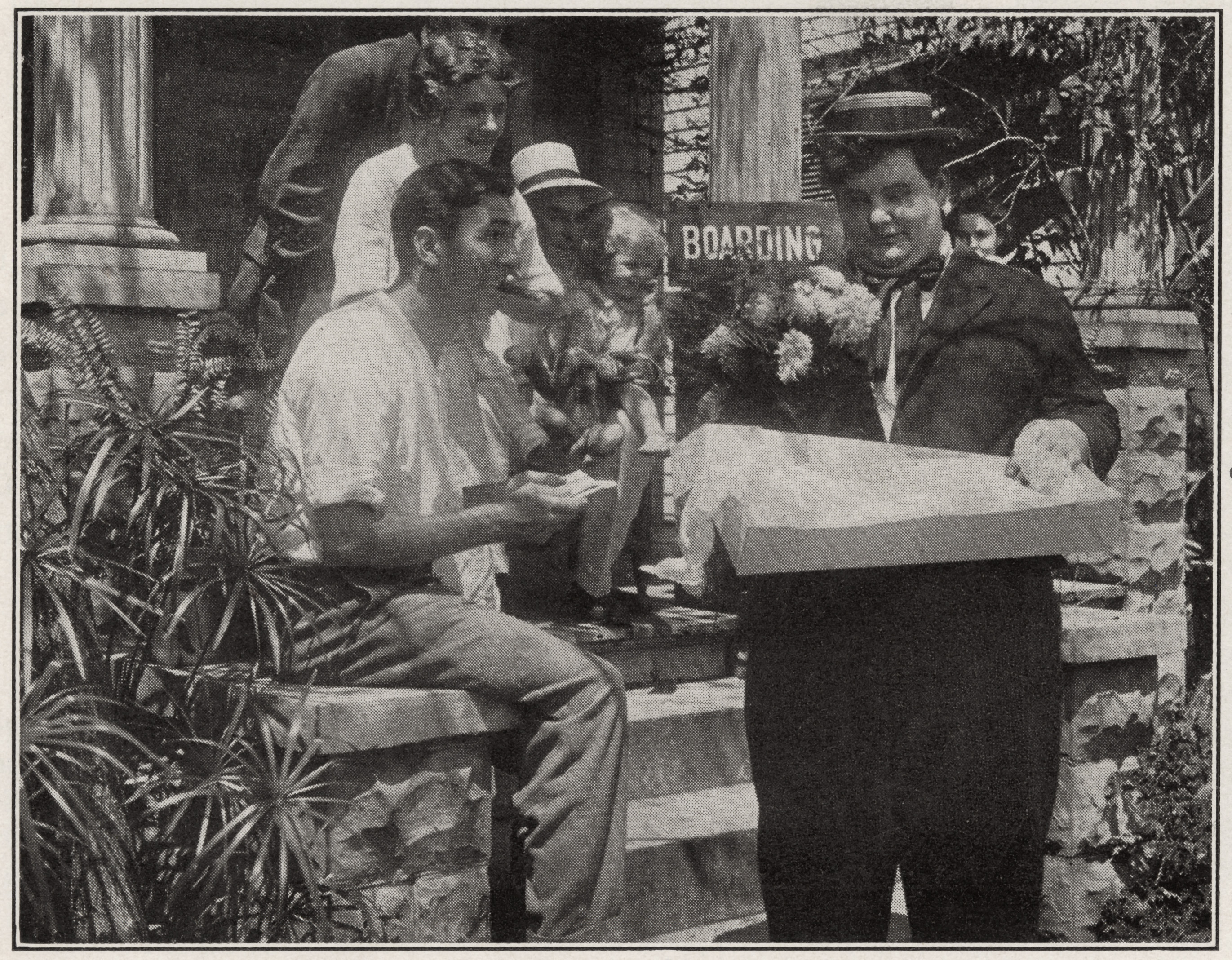
- Babe Hardy and the cast in a publicity still from Cupid's Target
- Directed by: Jerold T. Hevener
- Written by: Epes W. Sargent
- Produced by: Arthur Hotaling; Sigmund Lubin
- Starring: Oliver Hardy
- Distributed by: General Film Company
- Release date: January 19, 1915
- Running time: split reel
- Country: United States
- Languages: Silent film English intertitles

Cupid's Target is a 1915 American silent comedy film featuring Oliver Hardy.

== Plot ==
The following plot summary appeared in The Moving Picture World for January 16, 1915:

Bobby had to sit by Lucy's side and watch her get excited over the pitching of Marty, the pride of the village nine. Between root and peanuts, Lucy mentioned the fact to Bob, that MaTty. the pitcher and his bitter rival, was sending her the most beautiful flowers regularly. Bob began to speculate on the cost of the flowers, as he carefully counted his few small coins and shook his head sadly at the result of the inventory. He must get her some flowers and he was out of a job.

Next morning he notices an advertisement for a man wanted; he applies for the job and gets it. He is blacked up and told to stick his head through the hole in the sheet and let the people throw halls at him. And who should arrive but the village pitcher, escorting the fair Lucy. Marty throws the halls at Bob and they all land on Bob's "dome." Fear of recognition keeps him from running. Marty and Lucy pass on. Bob resigns and gets no pay for his work. Sorrowfully he passes down the street and a speeding auto hits him. The driver jumps out and gives B'ob some money and makes his escape in the car. Bob rushes to the florist and buys a big bunch of flowers and, as he is entering his boarding house, he is handed a note from Lucy in which she tells him that she and Marty have been married. Boh goes to his room and arranges things for a funeral and lays down on the bed with his hands folded across his breast and is at rest.

== Cast ==
- Oliver Hardy as Bob (as Babe Hardy)
- Frances Ne Moyer as Lucy
- Jerold T. Hevener as Marty
- Harry Lorraine as Waters
- C. W. Ritchie

== See also ==
- List of American films of 1915
- Oliver Hardy filmography
