= Pins Are Lucky =

1914 film

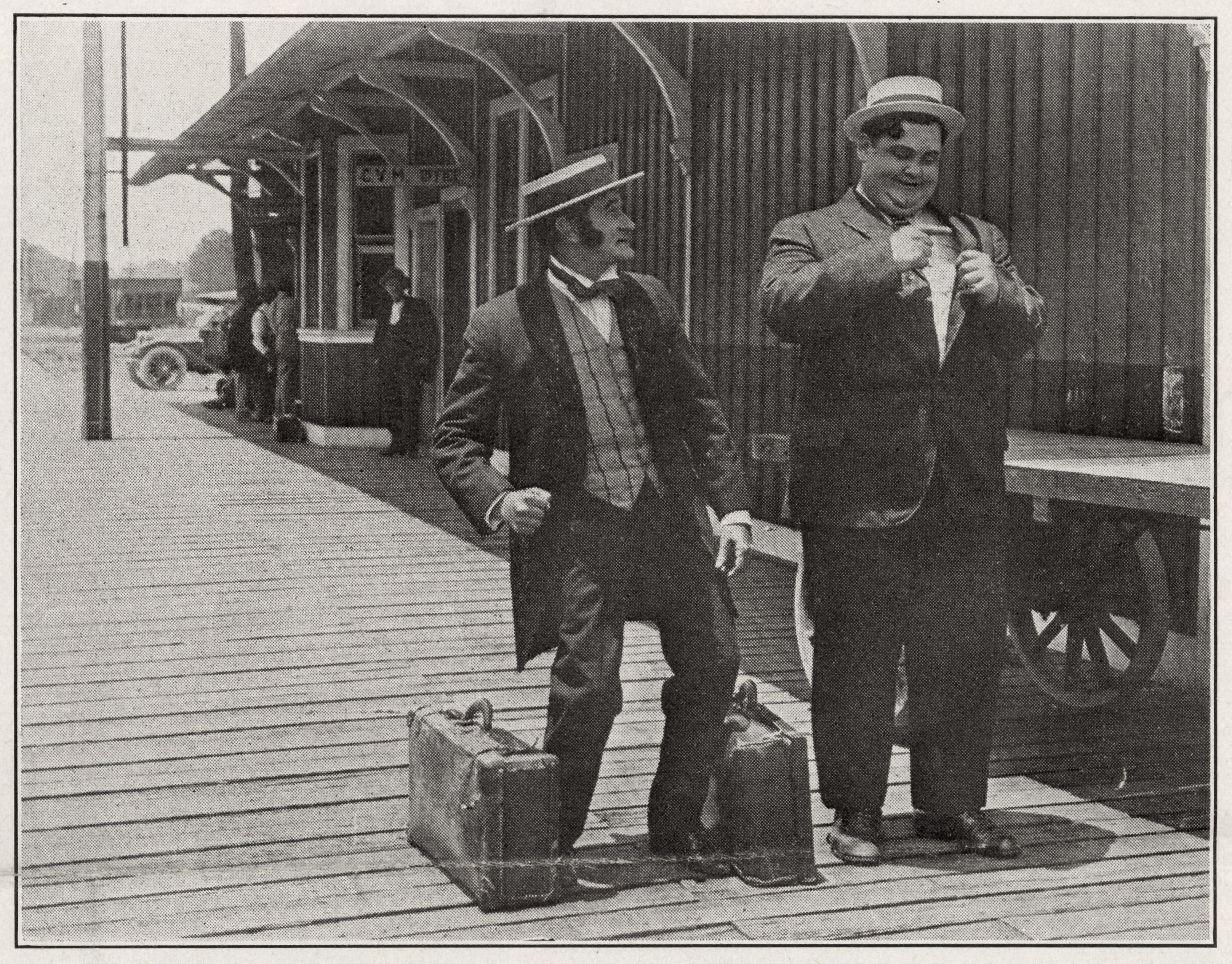
- Billy Bowers and Oliver Hardy in a publicity still from Pins Are Lucky
- Written by: Epes W. Sargent
- Produced by: Arthur Hotaling
- Starring: Billy Bowers; Oliver Hardy; Frances Ne Moyer; Raymond McKee
- Release date: September 19, 1914
- Running time: 5–6 minutes (c. 400 feet)
- Country: United States
- Languages: Silent film English intertitles

Pins Are Lucky is a 1914 American silent comedy film produced by the Lubin Manufacturing Company and starring Billy Bowers, Oliver Hardy, Frances Ne Moyer, and Raymond McKee.

== Plot ==
Cyrus Singleton believes the old superstition that finding a pin and picking it up brings good luck. So does Peter Pelton, the young man who wants to marry Cyrus's daughter, Ruth. Ruth is in love with John instead, but her father favors Peter as a suitor because of their shared superstition. He plans to send Ruth out of town with Peter to keep her away from John, but John outsmarts him by buying a large package of pins and dropping them on the ground on the way to the train station. Cyrus and Peter are delayed because they stop to pick up every pin along the way, and they arrive at the station just as Ruth and John ride off together.

== Cast ==
- Billy Bowers as Cyrus Singleton
- Frances Ne Moyer as Ruth Singleton
- Oliver Hardy as Peter Pelton (credited as O. N. Hardy)
- Raymond McKee as John Cozens

== Production and reception ==
Pins Are Lucky was written by Epes W. Sargent and produced in Jacksonville, Florida, at the Jacksonville unit of the Lubin Manufacturing Company of Philadelphia, under the general supervision of Arthur Hotaling. It was a short split-reel comedy, lasting approximately 5–6 minutes, and sharing a single reel of film with a second, unrelated comedy, The German Band, written by Romaine Fielding and starring Fielding, Edward and Eileen Sedgwick, and Robin Williamson. Both films were released by the General Film Company on September 19, 1914. Pins Are Lucky was one of a group of short comedies made by the Lubin company in 1914 and early 1915 that include the earliest screen appearances of Oliver Hardy.

The film received generally favorable reviews in the trade papers. The critic for Moving Picture World wrote, "It is an old saw, 'Find a pin and pick it up and all the day you'll have good luck.' E. W. Sargent has used this theme for a comedy. This superstition is probably more prevalent amongst all classes of people than any other existing. It is seldom that any one passes a pin that catches his eye, or hers, as the case might be, who does not stoop and pick it up. The incidents that the author has worked out of this are interesting and amusing. Pins are lucky for the lovers but not for dad and the rival." Motion Picture News praised the actors: "A crank on the luck of finding pins loves the daughter of another crank on the same subject. But the daughter loves another, and in spite of the schemes of the pin cranks, they cannot pin her down to their will. The characters are in the hands of real comedians : Bill Bowers as the crank father, O. N. Hardy as the crank lover, and Raymond McKee as the lover that is loved." The Bioscope singled out Hardy in particular, calling the film "an amusing little comic, in which the Lubin 'light-weight' [a reference to Hardy] has a congenial part. His devotion to a pet superstition involves him in some strange episodes, and finally loses him a wife."

== See also ==
- List of American films of 1914
- Oliver Hardy filmography
