= Floy Clements =

American politician (1891–1973)

Member of the Illinois House of Representatives from the 22nd district
- In office January 7, 1959 – January 4, 1961
- Preceded by: Cecil A. Partee (moved to 21st)
- Succeeded by: Lycurgus Conner

Personal details
- Born: Floy Stephens; November 20, 1891 Memphis, Tennessee
- Died: September 29, 1973 (aged 81) Niles, Illinois
- Resting place: Lincoln Cemetery
- Party: Democratic
- Education: Wilberforce University

Floy Mae Clements (née Stephens November 20, 1891 – September 29, 1973) was an American actress and politician in Illinois. She was the first African American woman to serve in the Illinois General Assembly upon her election to the Illinois House of Representatives in 1958. Earlier in her life she was an actress in two of Oscar Micheaux films.

== Biography ==
Floy Mae Clements was born November 20, 1891, in Memphis, Tennessee, to Alexander Stephens and Katie Stephens Smith. Her family moved to Chicago when she was three. Her father opened a chain of restaurants on the south side of the city. She attended Wendell Phillips High School followed by Wilberforce University, where she graduated with a degree in social studies. While at Wilberforce, she portrayed Alma Prichard in the 1920 silent film drama Within Our Gates, directed by Oscar Micheaux, and starring Evelyn Preer. She also had a supporting role in Micheaux's 1920 film The Brute.

Clements moved back to Chicago, settling in the Grand Boulevard community. In 1927, she joined the 4th Ward Democratic Organization as a precinct captain during a time when few African Americans supported the Democratic Party. She would eventually serve as the committeewoman under four different elected Ward Committeeman. In 1935, she was a member of the Negro Women’s Division of the Illinois Democratic Women’s Club.

During World War II, Clements was a member of the American Red Cross Motor Corps. Other notable civic involvement included service as Grand Traveling Deputy of the State of Illinois for the Improved Benevolent and Protective Order of Elks of the World, Worthy Matron of the Electa Chapter and Grand Officer of the Eureka Grand Chapter of the Prince Hall Order of the Eastern Star and service to St. Mark Methodist Church.

Clements ran for the Illinois House of Representatives in the 1958 primary with the backing of 4th ward Alderman Claude Holman. She was sworn into office on January 7, 1959. When asked why she entered politics and ran as a Democrat, she responded, “I have always, all my life, voted the straight Democratic ticket. I feel it is the party that has done most for Negroes.” According to the Chicago Tribune, the Moline Dispatch reported in 1958 that “Mrs. Clements said she was drafted for the post” and “has no particular political ambitions.”

She served as one of three representatives from the 22nd district with Republican Elwood Graham and fellow Democrat Charles F. Armstrong. During her single term in the House, Clements was assigned to the following committees; Education; Military & Veteran Affairs; Public Aid, Health Welfare and Safety; and Roads & Bridges. She was succeeded by Lycurgus Conner.

Floy Clements died in Niles, Illinois, and is buried at Lincoln Cemetery in Worth Township, Illinois.

== See also ==
- List of African-American officeholders (1900–1959)
