= Edison Bugg's Invention =

1916 film

- Directed by: Jerold T. Hevener
- Written by: Epes W. Sargent
- Produced by: Arthur Hotaling; Siegmund Lubin
- Starring: Raymond McKee
- Distributed by: Lubin Manufacturing Company
- Release date: July 1, 1916
- Country: United States
- Languages: Silent film English intertitles

Edison Bugg's Invention is a 1916 American silent comedy film featuring Oliver Hardy.

== Plot ==
The firemen are so engrossed in their card playing that they ignore the fire alarm. Edison Bugg's invention yanks their chairs out from under them when the alarm sounds.

This second plot summary comes from The Moving Picture World magazine for July 22, 1916:

The chief of the Tyretown Fire Department has a bunch of pinochle players for a crew; they get so much interested in the game that he has to go up and remind them that the alarm has been sounded. Edison Bugg gets an idea. He rigs up a counterweight and ropes all the chairs. When he presses a button the counterweight is released and the chairs are jerked from under the pinochle players. It works fine and Edison gets his sweetheart to bring her friends down to see it perform. She comes with a whole bunch of girls. The other firemen find out and poor Edison is crowded into the discard, even with Rose. The iron enters his soul. He presses the button. Coming on the scene of chaos they pounce on him and beat him up, but there is an interruption. The chief has been smoking under the counterweight. They go to his rescue and once more Edison gets his reward.

— Epes Winthrop Sargent

== Cast ==
- Raymond McKee - Edison Bugg
- Oliver Hardy - The Fire Chief (as Babe Hardy)
- Jerold T. Hevener

== See also ==
- List of American films of 1916
- Oliver Hardy filmography
