= What He Forgot =

1915 film

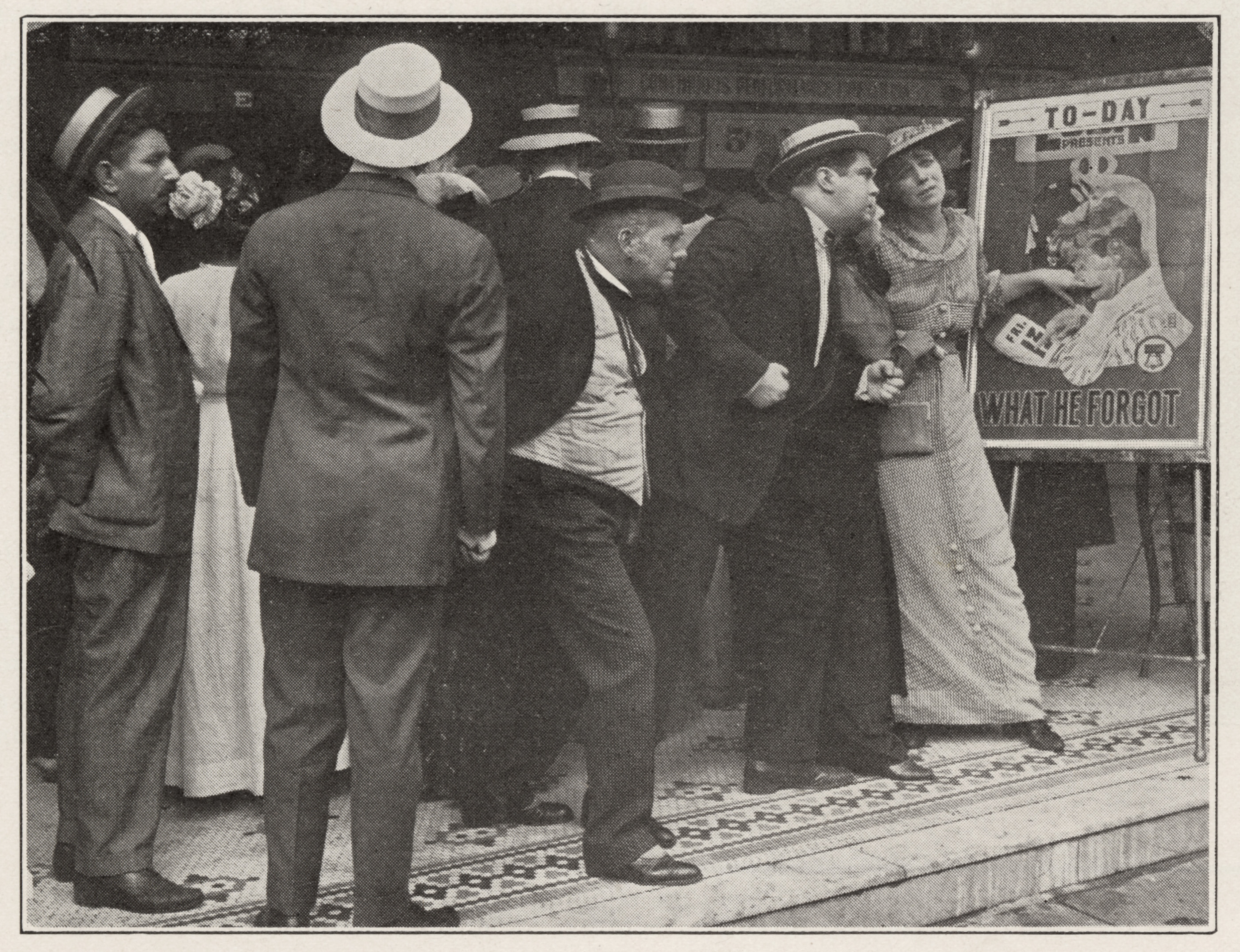
- Oliver Hardy and the cast in a publicity still from What He Forgot
- Directed by: Jerold T. Hevener
- Written by: Epes W. Sargent
- Produced by: Arthur Hotaling; Siegmund Lubin
- Starring: Jerold T. Hevener
- Distributed by: General Film Company
- Release date: January 2, 1915
- Running time: split reel
- Country: United States
- Languages: Silent film English intertitles

What He Forgot is a 1915 American comedy film featuring Oliver Hardy. It was on a split reel with He Gave Him a Million.

== Plot ==
This plot summary and review was published in The Moving Picture World for January 16, 1915:

A very effective comedy, showing how a man gets himself into trouble through his own foolishness—but there is an incentive which he cannot resist. As a laugh creator this release is a winner.

This one appeared in Motography for January 2, 1915.:

Bill Bailey, on his way to the office, stops to see them take a motion picture, and when the director suggests that he pose, and Bill learns he is expected to kiss the pretty leading woman, Bill jumps at the chance. Bill's wife, Bella, is a movie fiend, and at the theater she sees Bill kissing another woman. She tells her' brother, Jack, and her father, and Bill has a lively time as a result. Mae Hotely and Jerold Hevener featured.

== Cast ==
- Jerold T. Hevener as Bill Bailey
- Mae Hotely as Bella Bailey
- Eloise Willard as her mother
- George T. Welsh as her father
- Royal Byron as Jack
- Nellie Farron as an actress
- Oliver Hardy (as Babe Hardy)

== See also ==
- List of American films of 1915
- Filmography of Oliver Hardy
