= The Soubrette and the Simp =

1914 film

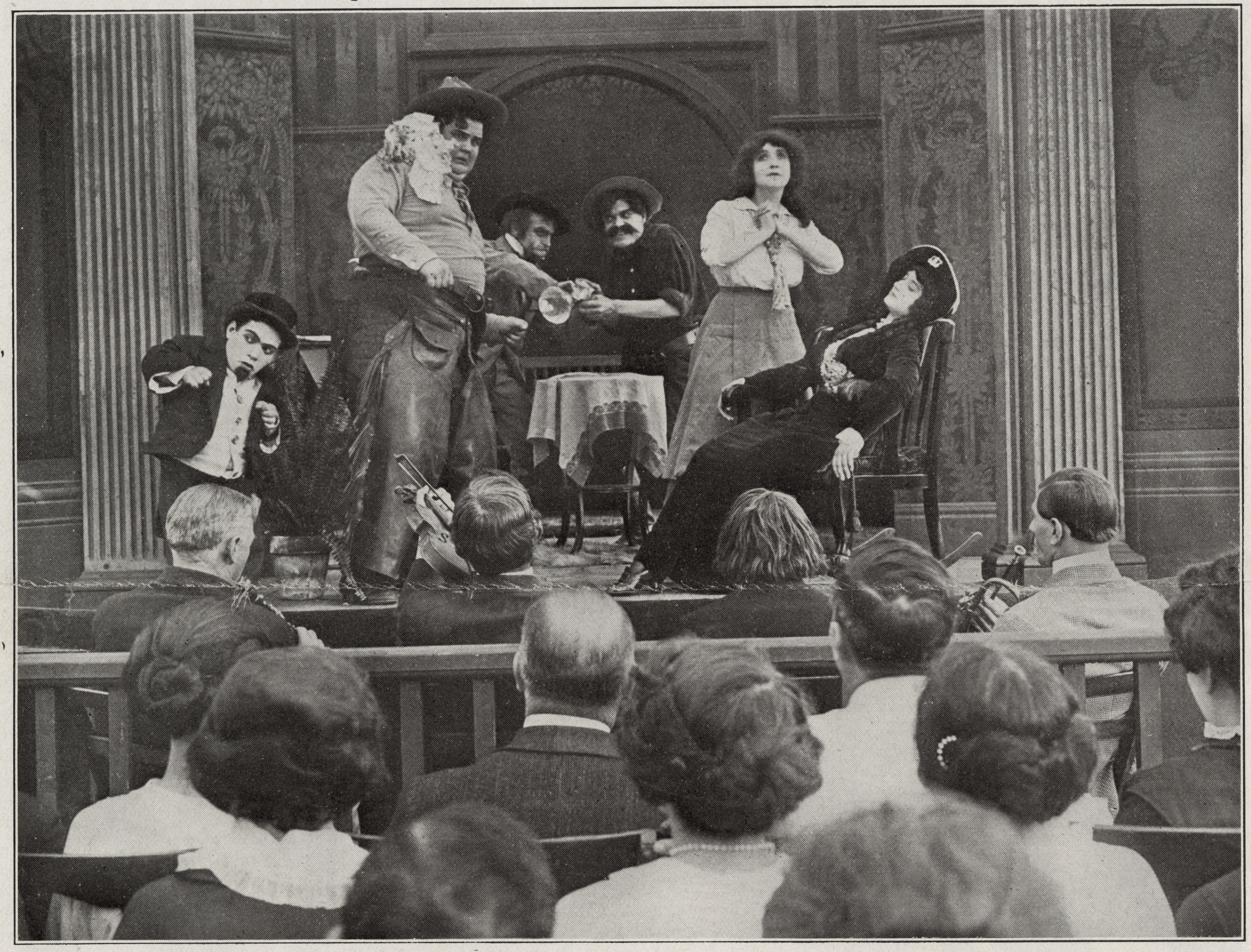
- Babe Hardy and Mabel Paige in a publicity still from The Soubrette and the Simp
- Directed by: Jerold T. Hevener
- Written by: Epes W. Sargent
- Produced by: Arthur Hotaling
- Starring: Oliver Hardy; Mabel Paige
- Release date: October 31, 1914
- Running time: c. 5 minutes (400 feet)
- Country: United States
- Languages: Silent film English intertitles

The Soubrette and the Simp is a 1914 American split-reel silent comedy film produced by the Lubin Manufacturing Company and starring Oliver Hardy and Mabel Paige.

== Plot ==
Fred, a simple-minded cowboy, goes to the theater with his fellow cowboys to see a western melodrama. When a young actress sings a song entitled "Come and Kiss Me", Fred leaps onto the stage to kiss her and is thrown out of the theater. He returns the next day, whereupon the manager, who is short of funds, offers him half interest in the company. Fred becomes the star of the show, and is also responsible for carrying all the baggage. As soon as his money runs out, he is fired. He lays his head on the railroad track, intending to kill himself, but changes his mind at the last minute.

== Cast ==
- Oliver Hardy as Fred, the Simp (billed as Babe Hardy)
- Mabel Paige as the Soubrette
- Don Ferrando as the Owner of the Show

== Production and reception ==
The Soubrette and the Simp was written by Epes W. Sargent, directed by Jerold T. Hevener, and produced by Arthur Hotaling, the general supervisor of the Jacksonville, Florida unit of the Lubin Manufacturing Company of Philadelphia. It was a short split-reel comedy, lasting approximately 5 minutes and sharing a single reel of film with An Interrupted Nap, a cartoon by Vincent Whitman. Both films were released by the General Film Company on October 27, 1914. The Soubrette and the Simp was one of a group of short comedies made by the Lubin company in 1914 and early 1915 that include the earliest screen appearances of Oliver Hardy.

The brief reviews of the film in the trade papers were generally favorable. Variety called it a "good comedy" and Motion Picture News an "amusing comedy", while Moving Picture World described it as "creative of much laughter". The critic for the New York Dramatic Mirror wrote that "this time E. W. Sargent has put something into his scenario, and it shows it is undoubtedly funny".

== See also ==
- List of American films of 1914
- Oliver Hardy filmography
