= Kidnapping the Kid =

1914 film

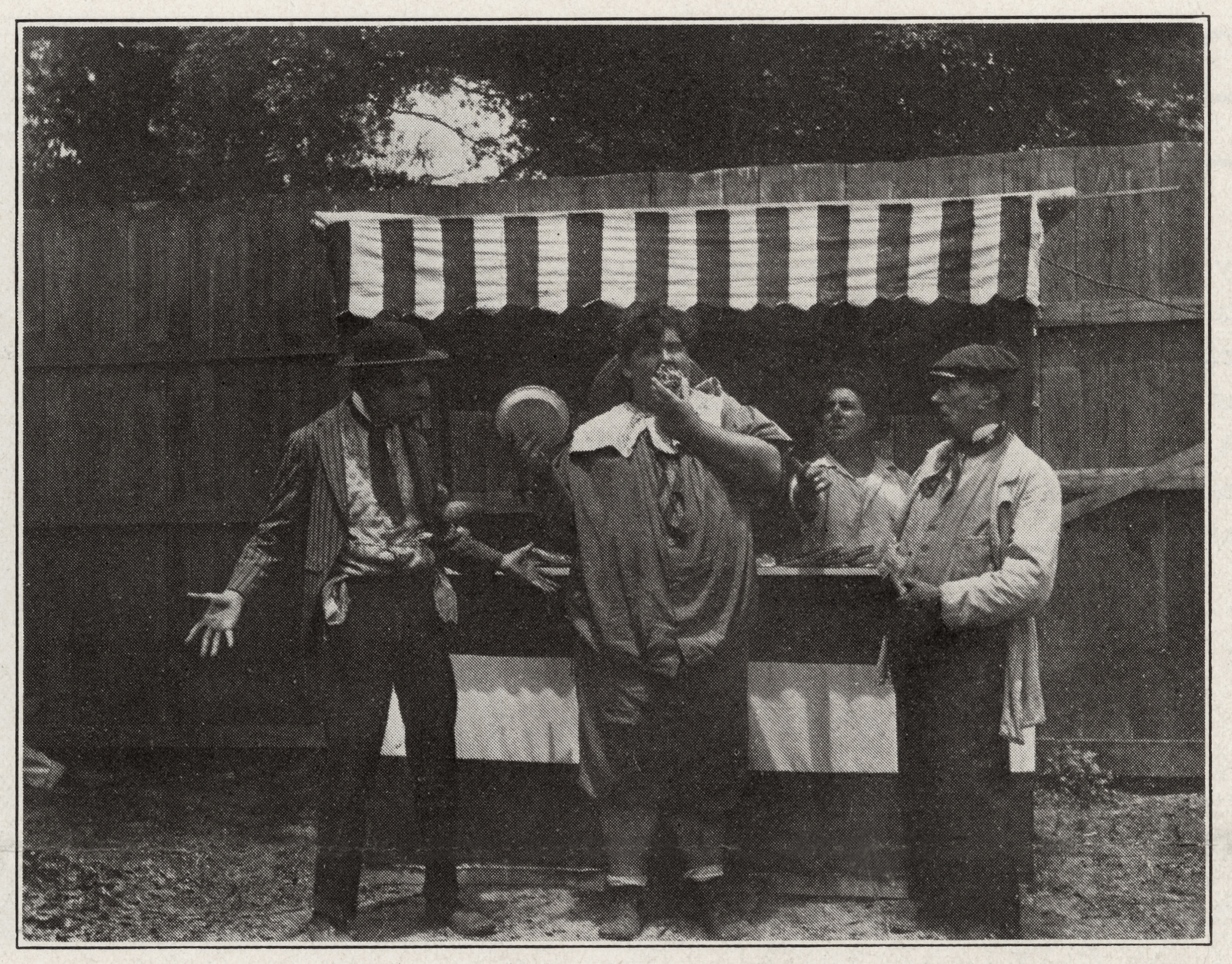
- Harry Lorraine, Babe Hardy, and Billy Bowers in a publicity still from Kidnapping the Kid
- Directed by: John A. Murphy
- Written by: Epes W. Sargent
- Produced by: Arthur Hotaling
- Starring: Harry Lorraine; Billy Bowers; Oliver Hardy
- Release date: November 7, 1914
- Running time: ca. 5 minutes (400 feet)
- Country: United States
- Languages: Silent film English intertitles

Kidnapping the Kid is a 1914 American split-reel silent comedy film produced by the Lubin Manufacturing Company and starring Harry Lorraine, Billy Bowers, and Oliver Hardy.

== Plot ==
Hans and Jake, two unsuccessful street musicians, decide to turn their hands to kidnapping. They abduct Willie, the oversize son of a millionaire, by offering him a ride in wheelbarrow. The plan to hold him for ransom, but Willie turns out to be spoiled and difficult to handle. He eventually catches a ride in a friend's car back to town, where his nurse, distracted by her boyfriend, never noticed that he was missing.

== Cast ==
- Harry Lorraine as Hans
- Billy Bowers as Jake
- Oliver Hardy as Willie Gold (billed as Babe Hardy)

== Production and reception ==
Kidnapping the Kid was written by Epes W. Sargent, directed by J. A. Murphy, and produced by Arthur Hotaling, the general supervisor of the Jacksonville, Florida unit of the Lubin Manufacturing Company of Philadelphia. It was a short split-reel comedy, lasting approximately five minutes and sharing a single reel of film with The Honor of the Force, an unrelated comedy starring C. W. Ritchie and Raymond McKee. The films were released by the General Film Company on November 7, 1914, and are among a group of short comedies made by the Lubin company in 1914 and early 1915 that include the earliest screen appearances of Oliver Hardy.

Most of the reviews in the trade papers focused specifically on Hardy's performance as the enormous kidnapped boy. The critic for Moving Picture World described the film as "a farce comedy written by Epes Winthrop Sargent, evidently to exploit Babe Hardy in the character of a young kid, who is kidnapped by a couple of curb stone musicians. They have an awful time and are eventually glad to get rid of him. J. A. Murphy has worked up the funny situations cleverly." The Bioscope called it "a brisk short comic, with Babe Hardy as the candy loving and ponderous juvenile. The two strolling players who essay the task of holding him up to ransom find themselves encumbered with a vigorous and hefty handful." Motion Picture News judged it "a good comedy" but Variety disagreed, dismissing it as "a melancholy split reel comedy. Not a laugh."

== See also ==
- List of American films of 1914
- Oliver Hardy filmography
