= The Smuggler's Daughter =

1914 film

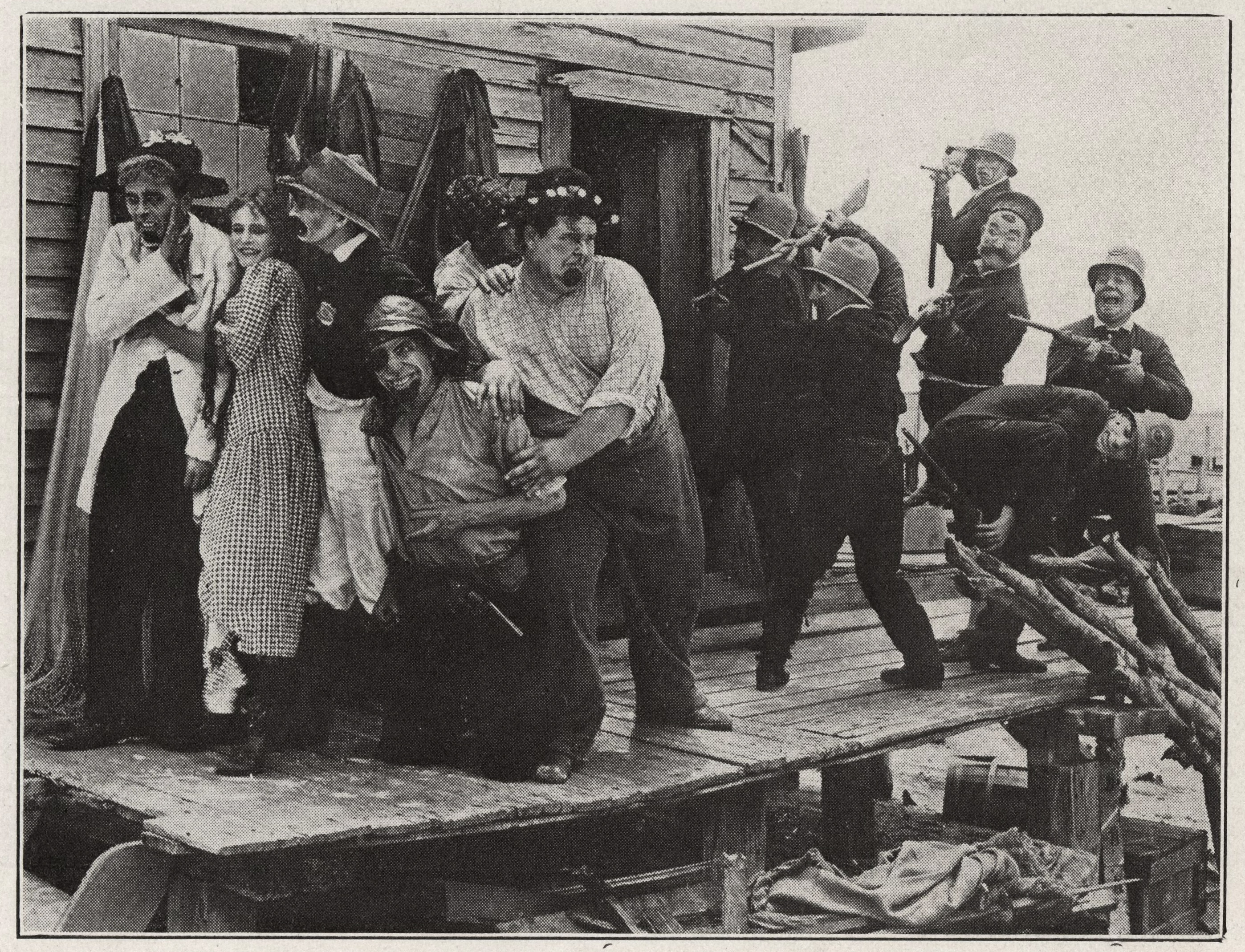
- "Babe" Hardy and the cast in a publicity still from The Smuggler's Daughter
- Directed by: Jerold T. Hevener
- Written by: Epes W. Sargent
- Produced by: Arthur Hotaling
- Starring: Raymond McKee; Eva Bell; Oliver Hardy
- Release date: October 17, 1914
- Running time: c. 10–12 minutes (1000 feet)
- Country: United States
- Languages: Silent film English intertitles

The Smuggler's Daughter is a 1914 American one-reel silent comedy film produced by the Lubin Manufacturing Company and starring Raymond McKee, Eva Bell, and Oliver Hardy.

== Plot ==
Gwendolyn's father is the leader of a gang of cheese smugglers. Customs agent Hans Schmidt is told that he must arrest the smugglers or he will lose his job. When he attempts to do so, he is captured by the smugglers, who take him to their lair and try to kill him with an overdose of limburger cheese. Gwendolyn saves his life by administering an emetic and helps him to escape. The police plan to arrest the smugglers, but Hans, remembering his debt to Gwendolyn, runs ahead to warn them. Just as the police descend on them, news arrives that Congress has placed cheese on the no-tariff list, so smuggling is no longer a crime. The smugglers are released, and Hans and Gwendolyn are free to marry.

== Cast ==
- Raymond McKee as Hans Schmidt
- Eva Bell as Gwendolyn
- Oliver Hardy as Dad, her father (billed as Babe Hardy)
- James Levering as an Amorous Fisherman
- William H. Hopkins as a Letter Carrier (billed as Bill Hopkins)
- John Edwards as a Negro

== Production and reception ==
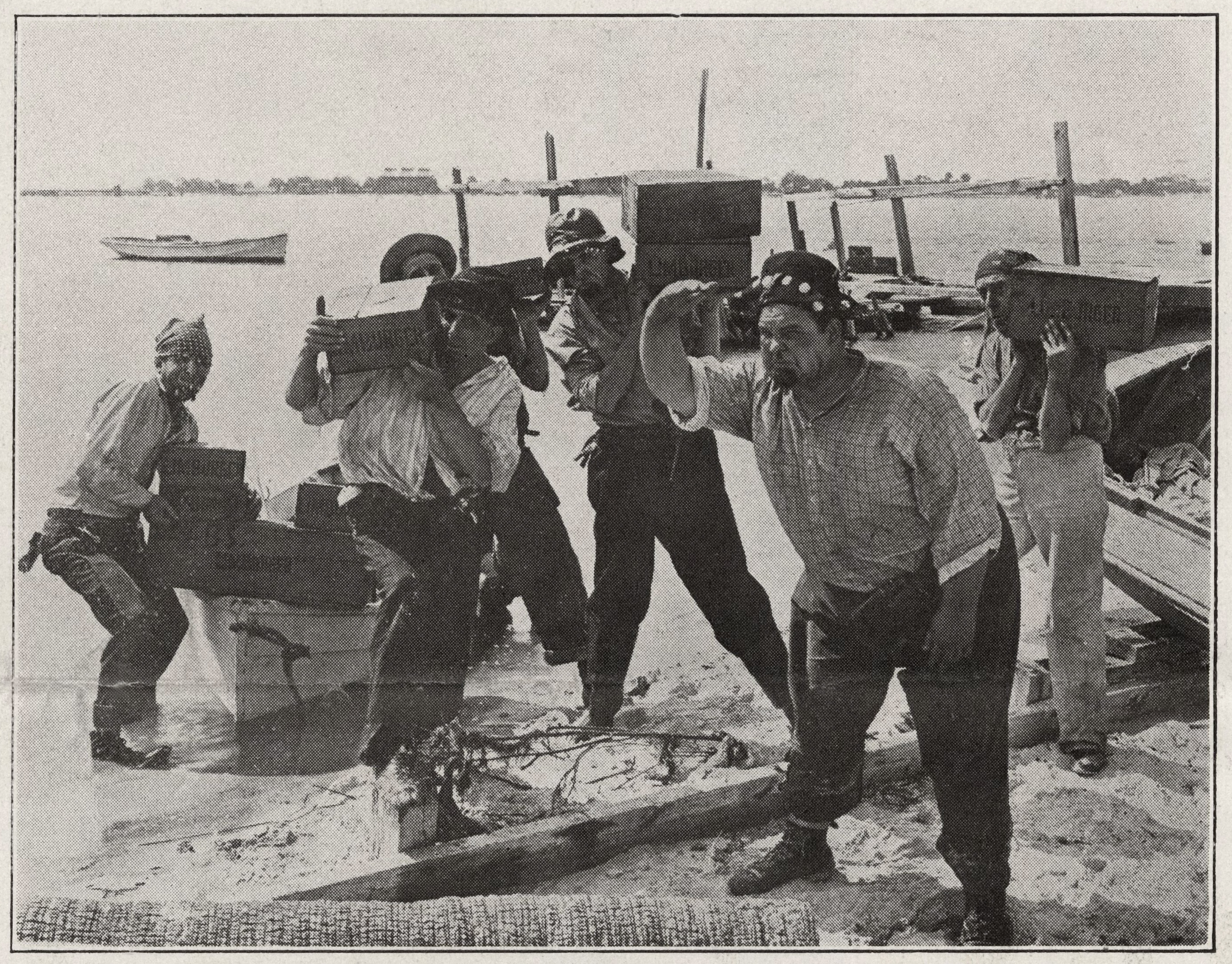
Another publicity still from the film

The Smuggler's Daughter was written by Epes W. Sargent, directed by Jerold T. Hevener, and produced by Arthur Hotaling, the general supervisor of the Jacksonville, Florida unit of the Lubin Manufacturing Company of Philadelphia. It was released by the General Film Company on October 17, 1914. The film was one of a group of short comedies made by the Lubin company in 1914 and early 1915 that include the earliest screen appearances of Oliver Hardy.

The film received favorable reviews in the trade papers. Moving Picture World described it as "a boisterous burlesque on a marine melodrama, written by E. W. Sargent, and directed by J. T. Hevener. This picture is quite humorous in conception and besides contains all the serious elements of a melodrama — produced in a burlesque manner. The valuable import that is being smuggled is 'Limburger cheese'. There is much strenuous work done by the actors, and great care has been taken in the selections of the scenes to bring out the points." The critic for The Bioscope praised Hardy's performance in particular: "The Lubin fat man [is] very funny as the chief of a desperate gang which participates in a riotously funny fight."

== See also ==
- Oliver Hardy filmography
