= He Won a Ranch =

1914 film

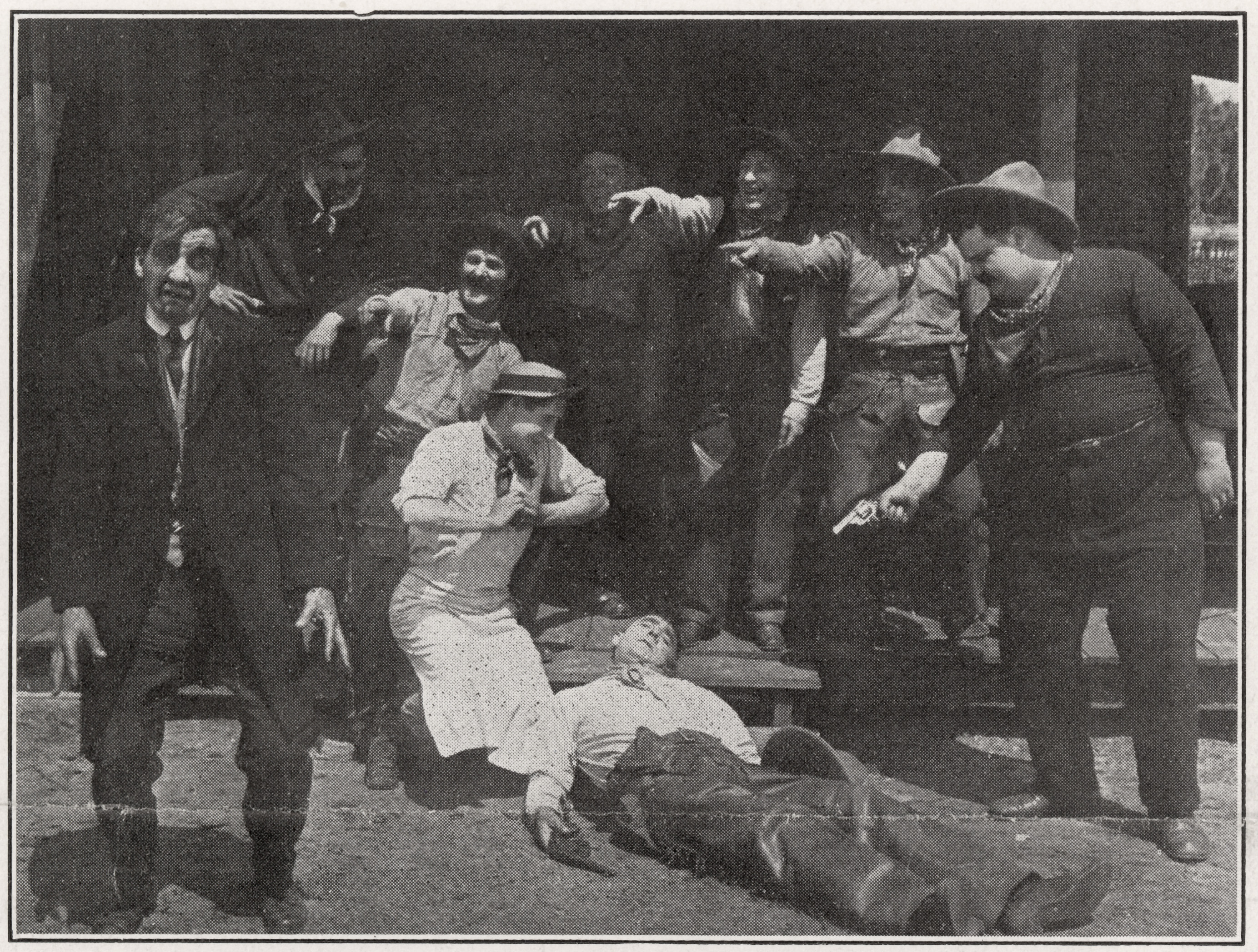
- Babe Hardy (right) and the cast in a publicity still from He Won a Ranch
- Written by: Epes W. Sargent
- Produced by: Arthur Hotaling
- Starring: Jerold T. Hevener; Raymond McKee
- Release date: May 19, 1914
- Running time: 5–6 minutes (400 feet)
- Country: United States
- Languages: Silent film English intertitles

He Won a Ranch is a lost 1914 American silent comedy film produced by the Lubin Manufacturing Company and starring Jerold Hevener and Raymond McKee. Also among the cast is Oliver Hardy, who has a small role as a cowboy.

== Plot ==
Dan Bell loses his ranch in a New York poker game. Isaac Rosenstein, the new owner, immediately heads west to take charge. He is not welcomed by the cowboys, who do what they can to make him miserable and drive him away. Rosenstein barely escapes with his life, and when Bell arrives to collect his belongings, Rosenstein gives him back the ranch and returns to his clothing business in New York.

== Cast ==
- Jerold T. Hevener as Isaac Rosenstein
- Raymond McKee as Dan Bell
- Ben Walker as Jim Bell
- James Hodges as Algie the cook
- Oliver Hardy as a cowboy (uncredited)

== Production and reception ==
He Won a Ranch was filmed in Jacksonville, Florida, at the Jacksonville unit of the Lubin Manufacturing Company, under the supervision of Arthur Hotaling. It was a short split-reel comedy, lasting approximately 5–6 minutes, and sharing a single reel of film with a second, unrelated comedy, Her Horrid Honeymoon, featuring Mae Hotely and Jerold Hevener. The films were released by the General Film Company on May 19, 1914.

He Won a Ranch included one of the earliest screen appearances of Oliver Hardy. Although the film itself does not survive, and he is not mentioned in any advertisements or reviews, Hardy can be seen, dressed as a cowboy, among the extras in a publicity still reproduced in The Lubin Bulletin.

The film was not well received by the trade papers. Moving Picture World wrote "This is a comedy; at least it is advertised as such, but it fails to fulfill its ultimate pretensions. Horseplay pertains throughout, and not very good horseplay at that." The New York Dramatic Mirror was particularly unimpressed by the plot, which was one of several devised for Lubin comedies in 1914–1915 by vaudeville critic Epes W. Sargent: "The idea runs so very unoriginally in the rut of thousands of precedents, that it fails to elicit many laughs, or to be underlain by any appreciable amount of humor. Jerold Hevener, Raymond McKee, Ben Walker, and James Hodges are the cast who also do their best, aided by a number of hard working seconds, but all to no avail with the plot as written."

== See also ==
- List of American films of 1914
- Oliver Hardy filmography
