= The Honor of the Force =

1914 silent comedy film

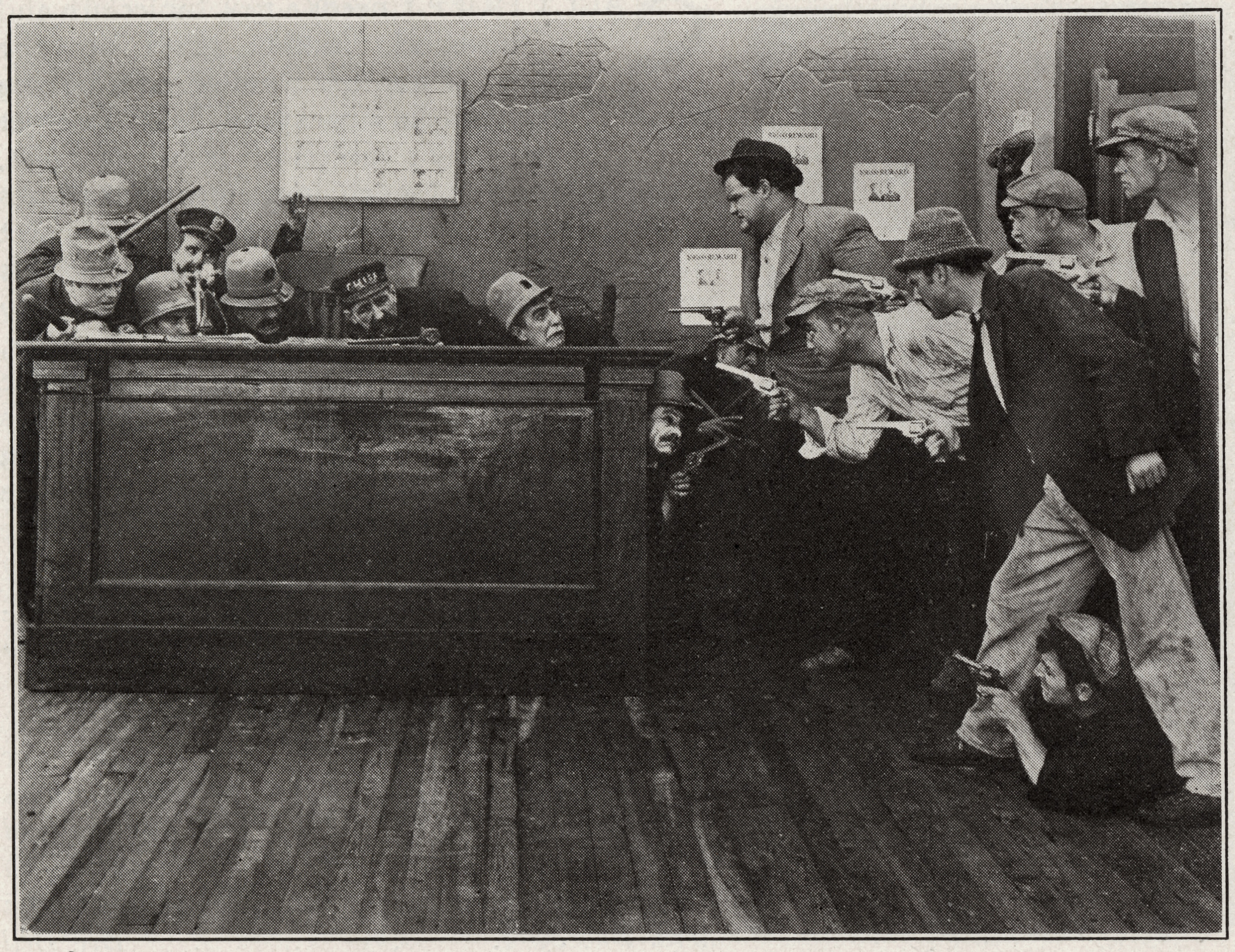
- Babe Hardy and his gang take over the police station in a publicity still from The Honor of the Force
- Directed by: Frank Griffin
- Written by: Frank Griffin
- Produced by: Arthur Hotaling
- Starring: C. W. Ritchie; Raymond McKee; Roy Byron
- Release date: November 7, 1914
- Running time: 6–8 minutes (600 feet)
- Country: United States
- Languages: Silent film English intertitles

The Honor of the Force is a 1914 American split-reel silent comedy film produced by the Lubin Manufacturing Company and starring C. W. Ritchie and Raymond McKee.

== Plot ==
The Pig Alley Pugs, a gang of hoodlums, send Gyp out to steal their next meal. He tries to grab some pies that Nora Malone has made for her sweetheart, Officer Bradley of the police. Bradley discovers him and Gyp throws a pie at him, but Bradley ducks and it hits Nora instead. As Nora beats Bradley for allowing the pie to hit her, Gyp escapes with another pie, which he accidentally smashes into the face of Fattie, the leader of the gang. The gang members march into town and take over the police station, but Bradley disables them with chloroform, earning a promotion and Nora's approval.

== Cast ==
- C. W. Ritchie as Officer Bradley
- Roy Byron as Nora Malone
- Raymond McKee as Gyp, the Dip
- Oliver Hardy as Fattie, the leader of the gang (billed as Babe Hardy)

== Production and reception ==
The Honor of the Force was written and directed by Frank Griffin and produced by Arthur Hotaling, the general supervisor of the Jacksonville, Florida unit of the Lubin Manufacturing Company of Philadelphia. It was a short split-reel comedy, lasting approximately 6–8 minutes and sharing a single reel of film with Kidnapping the Kid, an unrelated comedy starring Harry Lorraine, Billy Bowers, and Oliver Hardy. The films were released by the General Film Company on November 7, 1914, and are among a group of short comedies made by the Lubin company in 1914 and early 1915 that include the earliest screen appearances of Oliver Hardy. Rob Stone points out that this is the first known Hardy film to involve pie throwing. The cast list published in the Lubin Bulletin indicates that the role of Nora was played by actor Roy Byron in drag.

The brief reviews of the film in the trade papers emphasized the slapstick nature of the action and the thinness of the plot. Moving Picture World described it as "a slap-stick comedy which is more acrobatic than anything else, concerning a street gang and comedy police force. A horseplay effort." Motion Picture News concurred: "A wild slapstick comedy in which pies and other odd missles [sic] figure in a fight between the police and the 'Pig Alley Pugs'." The New York Dramatic Mirror wrote that "again the burlesque police come to the fore as a thin weave of plot is spun around them making their presence partly permissible"

== See also ==
- List of American films of 1914
- Oliver Hardy filmography
