= The Widow Casey's Return =

- Produced by: Siegmund Lubin
- Production company: Lubin Manufacturing Company
- Distributed by: General Film Company
- Release date: June 17, 1912
- Country: United States

The Widow Casey's Return is a 1912 American silent black and white comedy film produced by Lubin Manufacturing Company.

It's a lost film on one reel. The film was produced by the Philadelphia-based Lubin Manufacturing Company and was lost in an explosion and fire at the Lubin vaults in 1914.

== Cast ==
- Jerold T. Hevener as The Preferred Suitor
- Eleanor Caines as The Widow Casey
- Jack Barrymore as The Rejected Suitor
- Will Chamberlin as The Hobo

== See also ==
- John Barrymore filmography
