= It Happened in Pikersville =

1916 film

It Happened in Pikesville
- Directed by: Jerold T. Hevener
- Written by: Fred H. Hayn
- Produced by: Arthur Hotaling
- Starring: Raymond McKee
- Release date: July 29, 1916
- Country: United States
- Languages: Silent film English intertitles

It Happened in Pikesville is a 1916 American silent comedy film short featuring Oliver Hardy. It was written by Fred H. Hayn.

== Cast ==
- Raymond McKee - Exhausted Eddy
- C. W. Ritchie - Spent Spencer (as Charles W. Ritchie)
- Billy Bowers - Vimless Victor
- Harry Lorraine - Police Chief
- Oliver Hardy - Jiggs (as Babe Hardy)
- Mabel Paige - Julia Jiggs
- Ben Walker - Janitor
- Burt Bucher - Policeman

== See also ==
- Oliver Hardy filmography
