= They Bought a Boat =

1914 film

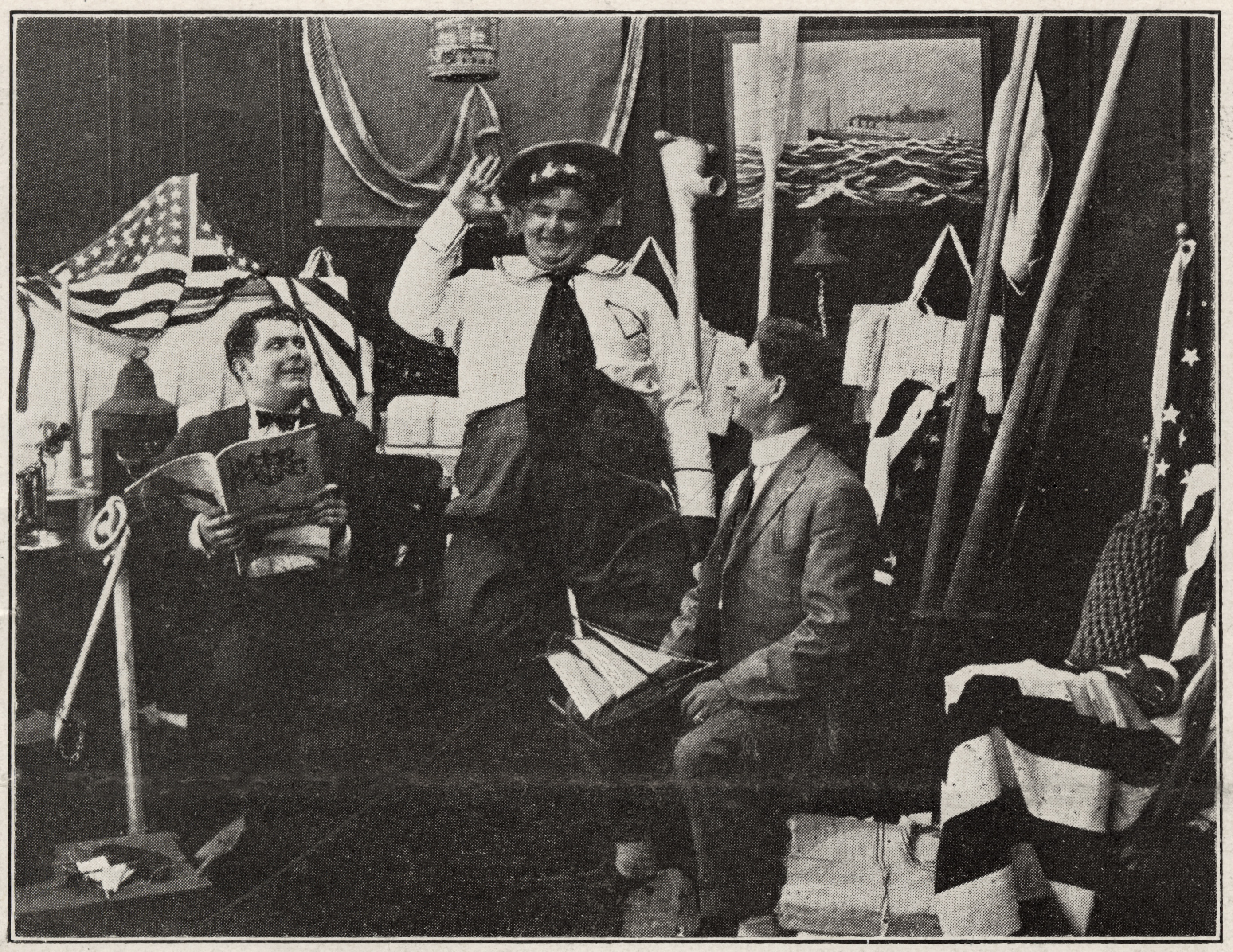
- Roy Byron, Oliver "Babe" Hardy, and C. W. Ritchie in a publicity still from They Bought a Boat
- Written by: John A. Murphy
- Produced by: Arthur Hotaling
- Starring: Royal Byron; C. W. Ritchie; Oliver Hardy
- Release date: August 14, 1914
- Running time: c. 5–6 minutes (500 feet)
- Country: United States
- Languages: Silent film English intertitles

They Bought a Boat is a lost 1914 American silent comedy film produced by the Lubin Manufacturing Company, featuring Roy Byron, C. W. Ritchie, and Oliver Hardy.

== Plot ==
Jack Burns and Billy Hale buy a boat, in spite of the fact that they know nothing about boating. They invest in uniforms and hire a fat cabin boy. When a government inspector tells them that they need proper safety equipment, they load up on life preservers, fire extinguishers, and fog horns, and the extra weight nearly swamps the boat. When they finally leave the dock, the boat leaks and their attempts at bailing and pumping fail. As they cry for help, an old mariner wades out to the boat and tells them that the water is only ten inches deep and they can walk back to shore. The captains return home and buy a croquet set instead.

== Cast ==
- Roy Byron as Captain Jack Burns
- C. W. Ritchie as Captain Billy Hale
- Oliver Hardy as Cabin Boy (as Babe Hardy)
- Ed Lawrence as Government Inspector
- James Levering as an Ancient Mariner
- Billy Bowers as Jack Kedge

== Production and reception ==
They Bought a Boat was filmed in Jacksonville, Florida, at the Jacksonville unit of the Lubin Manufacturing Company, under the general supervision of Arthur Hotaling. It was a short split-reel comedy, lasting approximately 5 minutes, and sharing a single reel of film with a second, unrelated comedy, The Puncture Proof Sock Man, starring Harry Lorraine. The films were released by the General Film Company on August 15, 1914.

They Bought a Boat is one of several short comedies made by the Lubin company in the spring and summer of 1914 that include the first screen appearances of Oliver "Babe" Hardy. In the earliest of these films he is usually an uncredited extra, playing one of a group of cowboys or cops. But by the time of They Bought a Boat he had begun to play larger roles and receive screen credit. Although the film itself is lost, Hardy's name appears in the cast list and he can be seen in a promotional still published in The Lubin Bulletin, a newsletter advertising the studio's new releases. According to film historian Rob Stone, "this is one of the first films that specifically used Babe's weight as part of the story." In the studio's newsletter and in contemporary reviews he is described as weighing 300 pounds, although Hardy was in fact rarely this heavy until much later in life.

The comedy received generally positive reviews in the trade papers. Motion Picture News described it as "the amusing adventures of some land lubbers with an overloaded, unseagoing vessel that is about to sink in ten inches of water" and noted that along with The Puncture Proof Sock Man the two split-reel shorts "make a very funny reel"; The Bioscope called it a "semi-nauticaI comic, depicting the adventures of two dudish novices with a motor-boat. A 'cabin boy,' of enormous bulk, adds to the fun by futile attempts to assist the mariners in distress."

== See also ==
- List of American films of 1914
- Oliver Hardy filmography
