= The Crazy Clock Maker =

1915 film

- Directed by: Jerold T. Hevener
- Starring: Billy Bowers
- Release date: November 10, 1915
- Country: United States
- Languages: Silent film English intertitles

The Crazy Clock Maker is a 1915 American silent comedy film starring Billy Bowers and featuring Oliver Hardy in a supporting role.

== Cast ==
- Billy Bowers
- Myra Brooks
- Ray Ford
- Clay Grant
- Oliver Hardy (as Babe Hardy)
- Betty Holton
- Beatrice Miller
- Mabel Paige
- C.W. Ritchie
- Walter Schimpf
- Bill Watson
- Hod Weston

== See also ==
- List of American films of 1915
- Oliver Hardy filmography
