= A Terrible Tragedy =

1916 film

- Directed by: Jerold T. Hevener
- Written by: Doty Hobart
- Produced by: Arthur Hotaling
- Starring: Jerold T. Hevener
- Release date: July 8, 1916
- Country: United States
- Languages: Silent film English intertitles

A Terrible Tragedy is a 1916 American silent comedy film featuring Oliver Hardy.

== Plot ==
The following plot summary appeared in The Moving Picture World for July 8, 1916:

Emile Scribbler, a reporter, is assigned to the job of reporting the hiding place of some Nihilists. He accidentally runs down Zola, the Chief's daughter, with his auto and discovers their rendezvous.

He is spotted and an effort is made to put him to death, but he is freed by Zola, who has fallen in love with him. He is pursued, overpowered by the Chief, and placed in a huge box. Professor Foddletop, a collector of mummies, who lives in the room above Emile, is preparing to ship the Queen of Sheba to a museum. He goes for a dray and when he returns he is horrified to find that the box has disappeared, it having been taken by the Nihilist thinking it the one containing Emile. The Professor hurries down to tell Emile of his misfortune and finds the box in which Emile is nailed fast. Hearing strange noises, he tears off the lid and Emile is released. The Professor tells him of the missing mummy and they give chase.

Arriving at the secret place Markoff, the chief, selects a firing squad. He sets the box upright and tells the men to fire into it five times as the spy is in the box. The first round fills the box full of holes. Zola, thinking her lover is in the box, rushes in just in time to receive the second volley. She dies. The chief seeing his daughter fall rushes in to get the third round. He dies. Emile and the Professor get the fourth and fifth round. The gunners seeing their mistakes, turn the guns on themselves and all drop dead.

== Cast ==
- Jerold T. Hevener as Emile Scribbler
- Oliver Hardy as Markoff (as Babe Hardy)
- Billy Bowers as Professor Foddletop
- Nellie Farron as Zola

== See also ==
- List of American films of 1916
- Oliver Hardy filmography
