= Within Our Gates =

1920 film by Oscar Micheaux

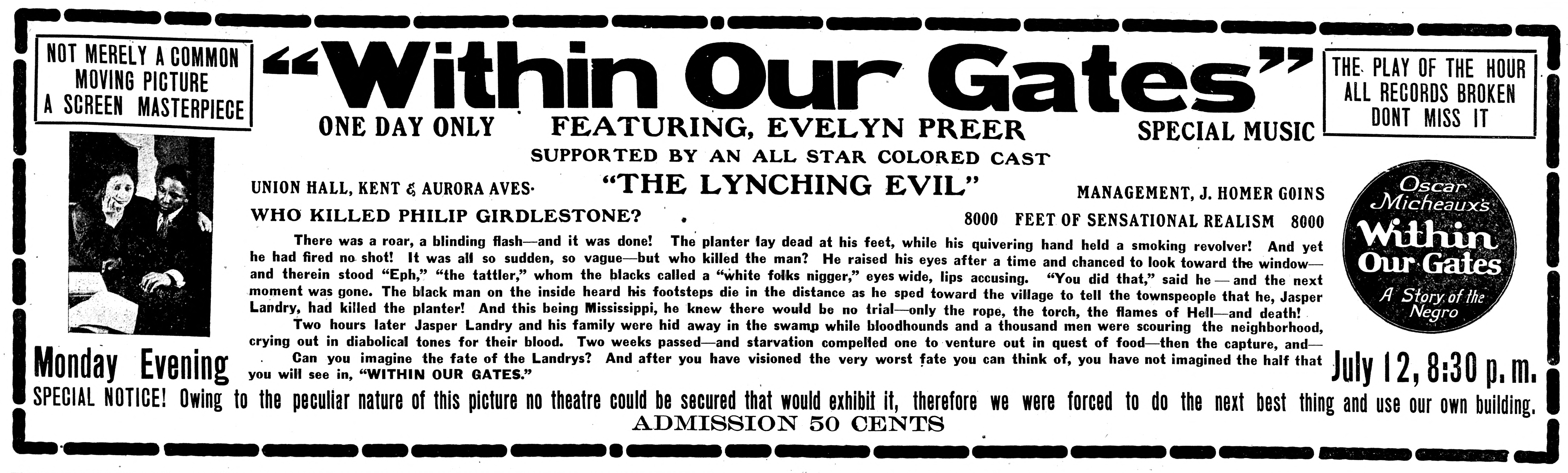
- Newspaper advertisement
- Directed by: Oscar Micheaux
- Written by: Oscar Micheaux
- Produced by: Oscar Micheaux
- Starring: Evelyn Preer; Floy Clements; James D. Ruffin; Jack Chenault; William Smith; Charles D. Lucas
- Music by: Philip Carli (not original to 1920)
- Distributed by: Micheaux Book & Film Company
- Release date: January 12, 1920
- Running time: 79 minutes
- Country: United States
- Language: Silent (English intertitles)

A restoration of Within Our Gates based on a 1993 transfer from a Spanish print; this edition includes reconstructions of some intertitles

Within Our Gates is a 1920 American silent race drama film produced, written and directed by Oscar Micheaux. The film portrays the contemporary racial situation in the United States during the early twentieth century, the years of Jim Crow, the revival of the Ku Klux Klan, the Great Migration of blacks to cities of the North and Midwest, and the emergence of the "New Negro".

The plot features an African-American woman who goes North in an effort to raise money for a rural school in the Deep South for poor Black children. Her romance with a Black doctor eventually leads to revelations about her family's past and her own mixed-race, European ancestry. The film portrays racial violence under white supremacy, and the lynching of black people. It is the oldest known surviving film by an African-American director and has been named as one of the greatest films of all time by a Black director.

== Plot ==
Sylvia Landry, a young African-American woman, visits her cousin Alma in the North. Sylvia is waiting for the return of Conrad as they plan to marry. Alma also loves Conrad. Larry, Alma's step brother, attempts to woo Sylvia but is rebuffed. Larry kills a professional gambler after cheating during a game of poker. Alma arranges for Sylvia to be caught in a seemingly compromising situation by Conrad when he returns. Conrad begins to strangle Sylvia but is stopped by Alma. Conrad leaves for Brazil. Sylvia returns to the South.

Sylvia meets Rev. Jacobs, a minister who runs a rural school for Black children called Piney Woods School. The school is overcrowded, and Rev. Jacobs cannot continue on the small amount offered to Black students for education by the state. With the school facing closure, Sylvia volunteers to return to the North to try to raise $5,000.

Sylvia's purse is stolen in Boston. A man named Dr. Vivian chases after the thief and recovers the purse. After running into the street to save a child from being run over, Sylvia is hit by the car herself. As she recovers in the hospital, she meets the owner of the car – Elena Warwick, a wealthy philanthropist. Learning of Sylvia's mission, Elena decides to give her the needed money. When her Southern friend Mrs. Stratton tries to discourage her, Warwick increases her donation to $50,000. This amount will save the school, and Sylvia returns to the South.

Rev. Jacobs asks for Sylvia's hand in marriage, but Sylvia, now in love with Dr. Vivian, refuses. Larry, on the run from the police, runs into Sylvia and attempts blackmail with secrets of Sylvia's past. Instead of having her secrets revealed to the school by Larry, Sylvia runs away in the night and heads north. Later on, Dr. Vivian searches for Sylvia. Larry, who has run out of money and returned to Alma, is fatally shot during an attempted bank robbery. Dr. Vivian by chance ends up treating Larry and meets Alma. Alma tells Dr. Vivian about Sylvia's past: these flashback scenes are portrayed in the film. Sylvia was adopted and raised by a poor Black family, the Landrys, who managed to provide her with an education.

During her youth, Sylvia's father Jasper Landry was wrongfully accused of the murder of Philip Gridlestone, an unpopular but wealthy white landlord, the accusation done by Philip's loyal Black servant, Efrem. A white mob attacked the Landry family, lynching the parents and burning their bodies afterwards. Their young son Emil managed to escape after nearly being shot. The mob also lynched Efrem despite him collaborating with them. Sylvia also escaped after being chased and attacked by Armand Gridlestone, Philip's brother, who overpowered her and was close to raping her. Noticing a scar on her breast, Armand realized that Sylvia was in fact his mixed-race daughter, born of his marriage to a local Black woman and had paid for her education.

After hearing about her life, Dr. Vivian meets with Sylvia; he encourages her to love her country and take pride in the contributions of African Americans. He professes his love for her, and they marry.

== Cast ==
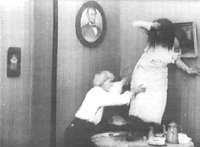
Still from the 1920 Oscar Micheaux film Within Our Gates featuring Grant Gorman and Evelyn Preer

- Evelyn Preer as Sylvia Landry
- Floy Clements as Alma Prichard
- William Starks as Jasper Landry
- Mattie Edwards as Jasper Landry's wife
- James D. Ruffin as Conrad Drebert, Sylvia's Fiancé
- Jack Chenault as Larry Prichard, Alma's Stepbrother
- William Smith as Philip Gentry, a detective
- Charles D. Lucas as Dr. V. Vivian
- Bernice Ladd as Mrs. Geraldine Stratton
- Mrs. Evelyn as Mrs. Elena Warwick
- Ralph Johnson as Philip Gridlestone
- E.G. Tatum as Efrem
- Grant Edwards as Emil Landry
- Grant Gorman as Armand Gridlestone

== Production ==
Within Our Gates was produced when early film studios in America's first motion picture industry were based in Fort Lee, New Jersey at the beginning of the 20th century.

Often regarded in the context of D.W. Griffith's The Birth of a Nation (1915), Micheaux's project has been considered by critics as a response. The film's portrayal of lynching shows "what Blacks knew and Northern Whites refused to believe", turning the "accusation of 'primitivism'... back onto White Southern culture".

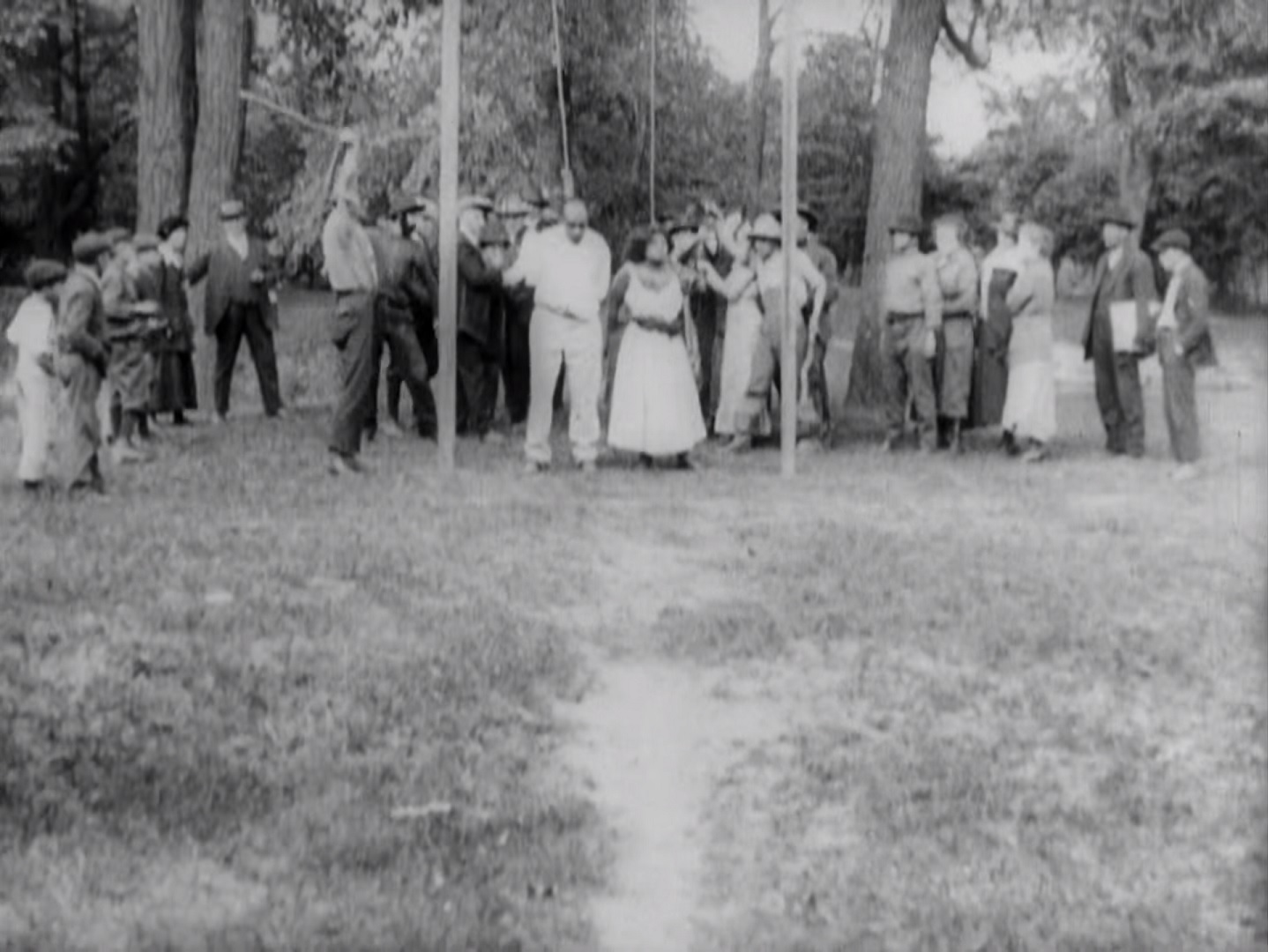
Still from Within Our Gates, portraying the lynching of Jasper Landry (William Stark) and his wife (Mattie Edwards)

Also during this period was the Chicago Race Riot of 1919, in which white mobs killed numerous Black people, and burned residential districts, leaving thousands of Black citizens homeless. The critic Ronald J. Green believes that Micheaux had seen that Black citizens had fought back in Chicago, and chose the title with an allusion to the risk to whites in future racial violence.

Within Our Gates was the second of more than forty films directed by Micheaux. On a limited budget, Micheaux had to use borrowed costumes and props. He had no opportunity to reshoot scenes.

== Preservation ==
After being presumed lost for decades, the film was found when a single print, titled La Negra (The Black Woman), was discovered in 1979 Spain by film historian Thomas Cripps. A brief sequence in the middle of the film was lost. Only four of the original English intertitles survived, the rest having been replaced with Spanish intertitles when acquired by the Filmoteca Española for Pts 4,000 in 1956.

In 1993, the Library of Congress Motion Picture Conservation Center restored the film as closely as possible to the original. Scott Simmon translated the Spanish titles back into English, removed explanatory material added for Spanish audiences, and drew from the style and diction used by Micheaux in his novels and in the intertitles for Body and Soul, his only silent film to survive with the original intertitles. The missing sequence was summarized with an intertitle frame.

== Response ==
Within Our Gates initially was rejected by the Board of Censors in Chicago when Micheaux submitted the film in December 1919. An article in the Chicago Defender of January 17, 1920, asserted: "This is the picture that required two solid months to get by the Censor Boards." A week later the Defender reported,

Those who reasoned with the spectacle of last July in Chicago ever before them, declared the showing pre-eminently dangerous; while those who reasoned with the knowledge of existing conditions, the injustices of the times, the lynchings and handicaps of ignorance, determined that the time is ripe to bring the lesson to the front.

Critics of the film feared that scenes with lynching and attempted rape would spark interracial violence in a city still tense from the riots of July 1919. Officials in Omaha (which also suffered a racial riot), New Orleans, and other cities objected for similar reasons when they blocked the screening of the film or demanded that those scenes be cut.

When released in January 1920 against reports of the controversy, the film garnered large audiences in Chicago. It was screened in differently cut versions. For example, an article in the Defender reported that on February 24, 1920, Within Our Gates would be shown at the States Theater in Chicago "without the cuts which were made before its initial presentation." Other evidence of cuts were extant film stills of scenes that did not appear in the surviving film copy, and viewers' descriptions that differed from the current version of the film.

It is considered an important expression of African American life in the years immediately following World War I, when violent racist incidents occurred throughout the United States, but most frequently in the South. In 1992, Within Our Gates was selected by the Library of Congress for preservation in the United States National Film Registry as being "culturally, historically, and aesthetically significant".

DJ Spooky created a new score for the film as part of a box set with Kino Lorber.

In 2023, Within Our Gates was named by Slate as one of the greatest films ever created by Black directors. The film was also the earlier film listed by Slate as being part of the "new Black film canon."

== Aesthetics ==
Micheaux's work has often been criticized as lacking aesthetic finesse or artistic power. Micheaux constructed Within Our Gates to educate his audience about racism, uplift, peonage, women's rights, and the urban "new Negro" emerging after the Great Migration.

His movement in the plot between North and South was similar to that of D. W. Griffith, who used a north–south marriage plot, but also expressed the mobility of peoples during this period. Griffith dramatized a white reunion of regions that canceled the legacy of the Reconstruction Era to leave blacks out of the national picture. Micheaux's film ended with a wedding that united sophisticated African Americans from the North and South. Together, they symbolically lay claim to the whole nation, despite discrimination against Black people in the military, and the racial riots of 1919, which were based in labor and social competition.

Critics (such as Jane Gaines, Ronald Green, and Pearl Bowser and Louise Spence) note how Micheaux intercut the lynching of the Landry family with the attempted rape of Sylvia by Gridlestone. This editing deconstructed the white ideology that lynching was to punish Black men for alleged sexual assaults against white women. Micheaux portrayed the more frequent sexual assaults of Black women by white men, alluding to the widespread historical practice of white men taking advantage of Black women slaves. Other passages were edited to deconstruct white visual traditions and white ideologies. The film also touched on several current social and political events, including the death of Theodore Roosevelt, the contributions of African American soldiers to the war, and debates in the US Senate over Jim Crow laws and labor peonage in the South.

== Representation of racism ==
The film portrayed several aspects of contemporary African American society. Heroes and heroines included Sylvia Landry and Reverend Jacobs, criminals such as Larry, and "lackeys" such as a minister whom Mrs. Stafford supported, who encouraged African Americans to reject suffrage. The critic Ronald J. Green suggests that Bernice Ladd as Mrs. Statton represents a "Lillian Gish figure", referring to her role in The Birth of a Nation. Statton is portrayed as racist and anti-feminist. Green notes that Micheaux intended the links between the films, and cast Ladd in part for her physical resemblance to Gish. Early in Within Our Gates Micheaux uses the character Mrs. Geraldine Stratton, a rich southern white woman, to depict the reality of American life not a world where there are no white people. Mrs. Stratton embodies the essence of southern prejudice; as a result of her fear of black women receiving the right to vote, she opposes women suffrage. With the use of the cinematic techniques, the viewer looks over the shoulder of Mrs. Stratton as she reads a newspaper article entitled "Law Proposed to Stop Negroes". This article explains that the Mississippi senator James K. Vardaman has proposed a bill to negate the Fifteenth Amendment. Vardaman justifies his action by stating: "from the soles of their flat feet to the crown of their head, negroes are undoubtedly inferior beings, therefore, how can we in conscience permit them to vote?"

Efrem, a servant to Gridlestone, denounced Mr. Landry as the murderer, although he was not a witness to the crime. Overturning the relationship which Efrem believed he had with whites, a mob lynched him when it failed to find the Landrys.

The character of Old Ned justifies the present racial system as God's ordained plan; being poor and uneducated are attributes that will lead African Americans into heaven. He preaches to his congregation that "white folks, with all their schooling, all their wealth, will most all fall into the everlasting inferno, while our race, lacking these vices and whose souls are more pure, most all will ascend to heaven." In one of the most heartbreaking and provoking scenes of the film, Old Ned after humiliating himself in a room full of whites, closes the door and turns from a smiling buffoon to a repulsed black man. It has all been a performance. Old Ned says to the camera, "Again I've sold my birthright. All for a miserable 'mess of pottage.'" Hopeless and unfulfilled, he states: "Negroes and whites – all are equal. As for me, miserable sinner, Hell is my destiny." Uncle Tom characters are a staple in mainstream media. As Old Ned reprimands himself, Micheaux implies that these characters are less than a man.
