= Outwitting Dad =

1914 film by Arthur Hotaling

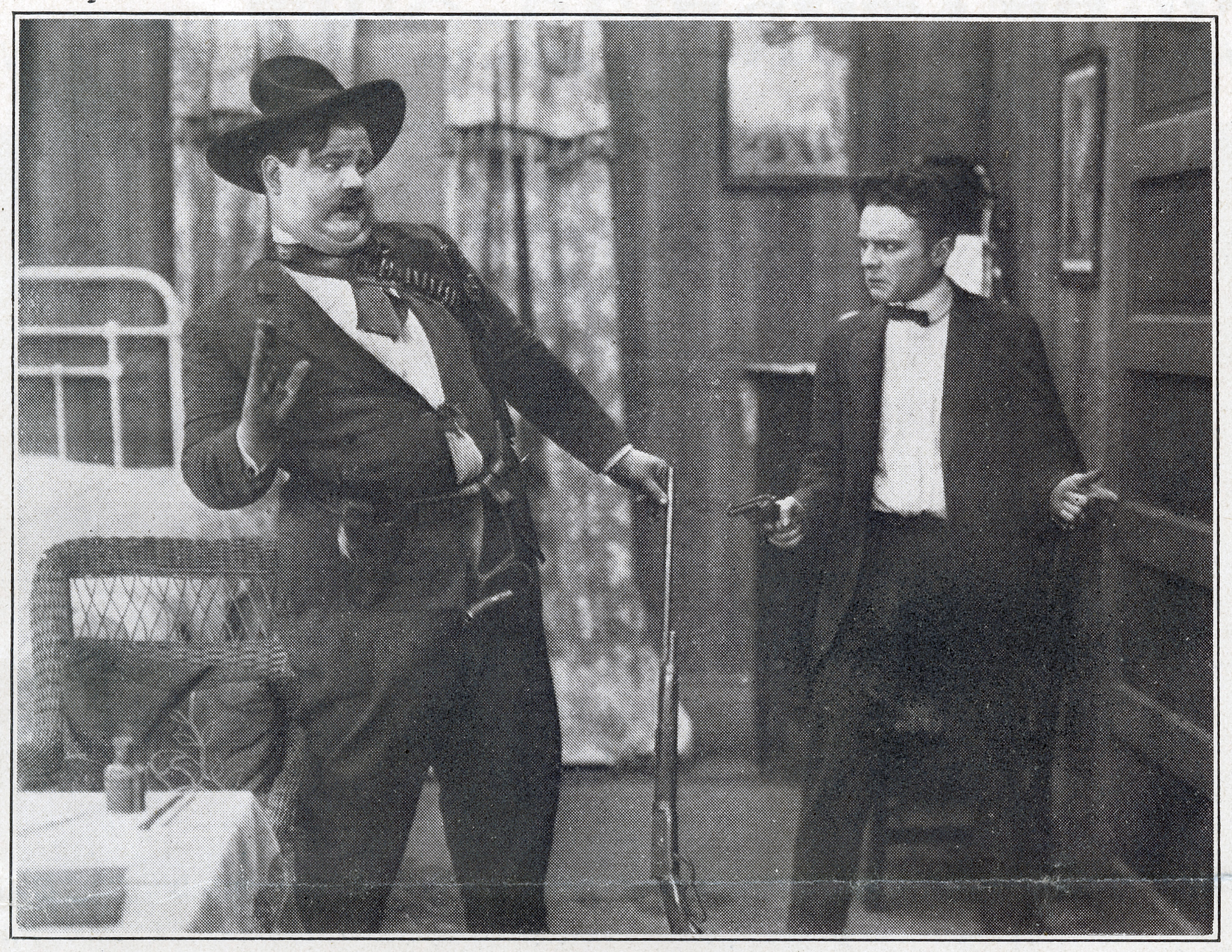
- Oliver Hardy and Raymond McKee in a publicity still from Outwitting Dad
- Directed by: Arthur Hotaling
- Written by: Frank Griffin
- Produced by: Lubin Manufacturing Company
- Starring: Billy Bowers; Raymond McKee; Oliver Hardy; Frances Ne Moyer
- Release date: April 21, 1914
- Running time: c. 5 minutes (400 feet)
- Country: United States
- Language: Silent with English intertitles

Outwitting Dad is a lost 1914 American silent comedy film produced by the Lubin Manufacturing Company and featuring Billy Bowers, Raymond McKee, and Oliver Hardy in his first known screen appearance.

== Plot ==
Bob Kewp wants to marry Lena Gross, but Lena's father, Herman Gross, refuses permission. Bob dresses his brother Reggie as a bandit and Reggie chases Gross into a stable. Believing that his life is in danger, Gross agrees to the marriage. While Reggie stands guard outside the door, Bob and Lena run off to get married. Reggie falls asleep and receives a thrashing from Gross when he discovers the trick. When the newlyweds Bob and Lena return, Lena persuades her father to approve of the wedding.

== Cast ==
- Billy Bowers as Herman Gross
- Raymond McKee as Bob Kewp
- Oliver Hardy as Reggie Kewp (credited as O. N. Hardy)
- Frances Ne Moyer as Lena Gross

== Production ==
Outwitting Dad was filmed in Jacksonville, Florida in the spring of 1914. It was produced and directed by Arthur Hotaling, who supervised the Lubin Manufacturing Company's Jacksonville productions. It was released on April 21, 1914, as one half of a split reel (two short comedies on a single 1000-foot reel of film), sharing the reel with The Rube's Duck, featuring Billy Bowers and Jerry Hevener.

The film is remembered chiefly as the earliest recorded onscreen appearance of Oliver Hardy, then 22 years old. According to his wife, Lucille, Hardy had been at the film lot, "just hanging around watching the Lubin Company work, when suddenly they needed a fat boy for a comedy sequence." He performed well enough on this occasion to earn a contract with the company. Whether the film in question was Outwitting Dad is unclear; because the role of Reggie is a large one and integral to the plot, rather than a spur-of-moment comedy sequence, it seems likely that the story refers to a smaller, uncredited role in an earlier lost film.

Like most of the earliest Lubin shorts, Outwitting Dad does not survive. It is assumed that the negatives and original prints perished in the disastrous explosion and fire that destroyed the Lubin film vault in Philadelphia, Pennsylvania, on June 13, 1914.

== Reception ==
The film received mixed reviews. Motion Picture News called it "a fine comedy," but Moving Picture World compared it unfavorably to The Rube's Duck on the same reel, dismissing it as "a comedy that's about on par with the 'also rans' of the pioneer days of animated pictures". The New York Dramatic Mirror described it as "overacted at times, and not especially funny", but it did single out Hardy's performance for special notice.

== See also ==
- List of American films of 1914
- Oliver Hardy filmography
