= A Prize Package =

- Produced by: Siegmund Lubin
- Production company: Lubin Manufacturing Company
- Distributed by: General Film Company
- Release date: August 5, 1912
- Country: United States

A Prize Package is a 1912 American silent black and white comedy film produced by Siegmund Lubin.

It's a lost film on one reel. The film was produced by the Philadelphia-based Lubin Manufacturing Company and was lost in an explosion and fire at the Lubin vaults in 1914.

== Cast ==
- Jerold T. Hevener as Spoony Pete
- Eleanor Caines as Fannie Fatima
- Marie Rainford as Miss Wiggins
- Jack Barrymore as Si Hawkins
- William Raus as The Old Maid

== See also ==
- John Barrymore filmography
