= Good Cider =

1914 film

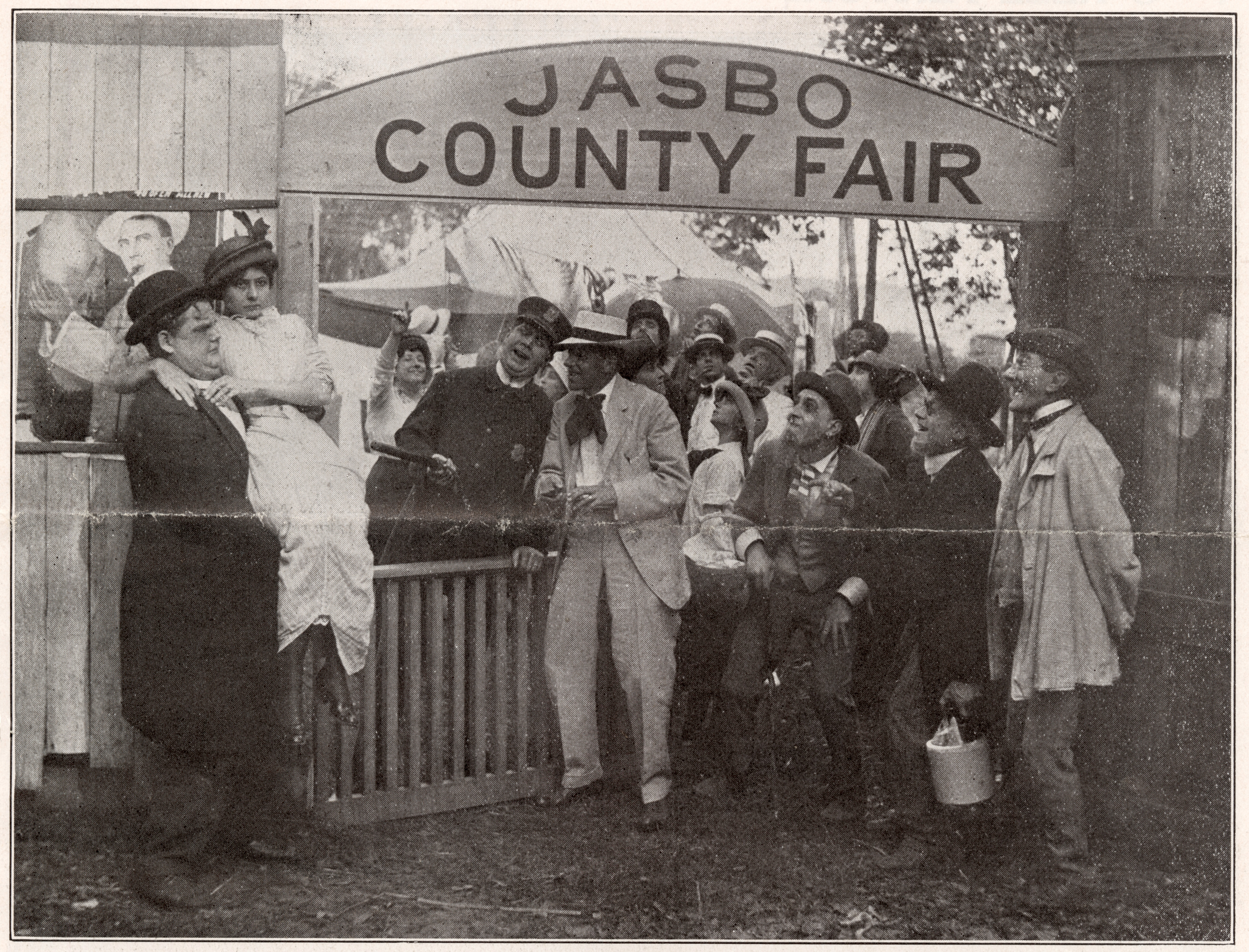
- "Babe" Hardy and the cast in a publicity still from Good Cider
- Directed by: John A. Murphy
- Written by: John A. Murphy
- Produced by: Arthur Hotaling
- Starring: Ben Walker; Jane Calhoun; Billy Bowers; Oliver Hardy; James Levering
- Release date: June 16, 1914
- Running time: 7-8 minutes (c. 600 feet)
- Country: United States
- Languages: Silent film English intertitles

Good Cider is a lost 1914 American silent comedy film produced by the Lubin Manufacturing Company, featuring Jane Calhoun, Ben Walker, Billy Bowers, Oliver Hardy, and James Levering.

== Plot ==
Zeke and Jane cook up some cider, but the locals suggest adding various ingredients (mustard, cloves, raisins, etc.) to improve the flavor. That night each member of the family secretly adds another ingredient to the barrel. The result tastes terrible, so they set it out for the junk man. He takes it to the county fair and tries to sell it. A tramp secretly bores a hole in the back of the barrel and also tries to sell it. No one wants to buy until someone empties a bottle of whiskey into the barrel, after which everyone agrees that it is "durned good cider".

== Cast ==
- Ben Walker as Uncle Zeke
- Julia Calhoun as Aunt Jane
- Billy Bowers as Hank
- Oliver Hardy as Hiram (credited as Babe Hardy)
- James Levering as The Squire

== Production and reception ==
Good Cider was filmed in Jacksonville, Florida, at the Jacksonville unit of the Lubin Manufacturing Company, under the supervision of Arthur Hotaling. It was a short split-reel comedy, lasting approximately 7–8 minutes, and sharing a single reel with a second, unrelated film, The Shell Comb Industry, a documentary about the making of tortoise-shell combs. The films were released by the General Film Company on June 16, 1914.

Good Cider is one of several short comedies made in the spring and summer of 1914 that include the first screen appearances of Oliver Hardy. In the earliest of these films he is usually an uncredited extra, playing one of a group of cowboys or cops. But by the time of Good Cider he had begun to play larger roles and receive screen credit. Although the film itself is lost, Hardy's name (as Babe Hardy) appears in the cast list and he can be seen in a promotional still published in The Lubin Bulletin, a newsletter advertising the studio's new releases.

Reviews in the trade papers treated Good Cider more kindly than many of the other Lubin split-reel comedies released in mid-1914. Motion Picture News called it "an amusing comedy of the experiences that a barrel of cider went through. It finally ends up by being wholly whiskey, and all are much pleased with it." The Bioscope wrote that "various additions to a barrel of cider and its ultimate end on a fair ground are the means of hilarious scenes". The New York Dramatic Mirror noted that it received "a few hearty laughs," and added that "a lot of incidental business enlivens the above skeleton [of a plot] with its drollery and original conceit.". Moving Picture World was even more enthusiastic, describing the film as "a rural comedy with a barrel of cider as the main theme. It is a very laughable number and enjoyable, especially to those who have lived in the country. Everybody doctors the cider and eventually the cider doctors everybody, even the doctor. In the finale the barrel is empty and everybody is full. See this picture if possible."

== See also ==
- List of American films of 1914
- Oliver Hardy filmography
