= Eleanor Caines =

American actress

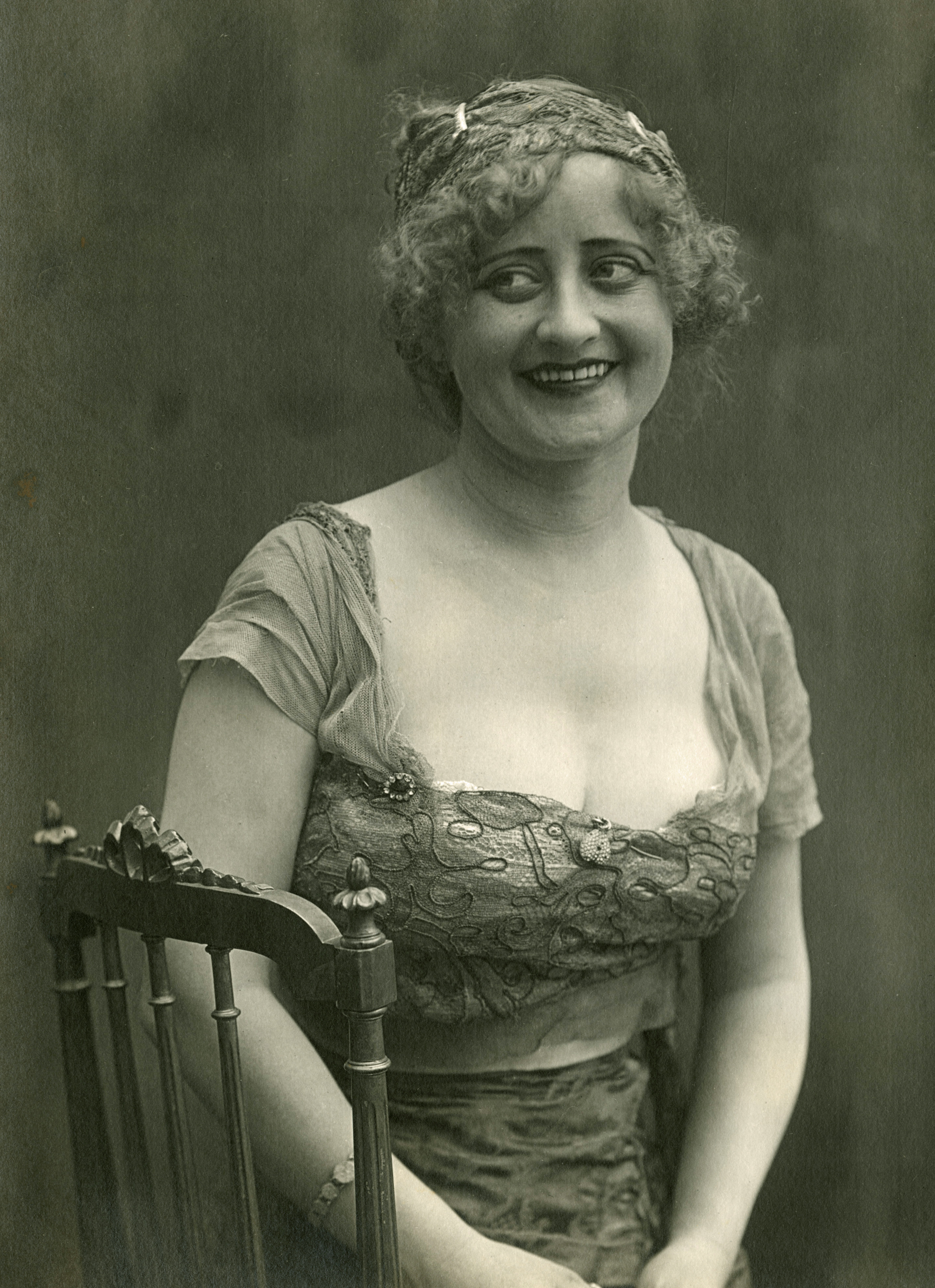
- Eleanor Caines, ca. 1910–1913
- Born: 1870 or 1880; Philadelphia, Pennsylvania, U.S.
- Died: June 3, 1913; Philadelphia, Pennsylvania, U.S.
- Occupation: Film Actress
- Spouses: Jack Le Faint; William Robson

Eleanor Caines (1870 or 1880–1913) was an American silent film actress. She spent most of her film career at the Lubin Film Company. Caines died in 1913 in her hometown Philadelphia.

== Filmography ==
- Blissville the Beautiful (1909) *short
- Three Fingered Jack (1909) *short
- The Tattooed Arm (1910)*short
- Over the Wire (1910) *short
- Marriage in Haste (1910)*short
- Back to Boarding (1910)*short
- Indian Blood (1910)*short
- The Miner's Sweetheart (1910)*short
- A Veteran of the G.A.R. (1910)*short
- The New Boss of Bar X Ranch (1910)*short
- Red Eagle's Love Affair (1910)*short
- Faith Lost and Won (1910)*short
- The Adopted Daughter (1910)*short
- The Stronger Sex (1910)*short
- The Sheriff's Capture (1910)*short
- Liz's Career (1910)*short
- Art and the Legacy (1911)*short
- The Dream of a Moving Picture Director (1912)*short
- The Widow Casey's Return (1912)*short
- Just Pretending (1912)*short
- A Prize Package (1912)*short
- A Red Hot Courtship (1912)*short
- His Pair of Pants (1912)*short
- Felix at the Ball (1912)*short
- Once Was Enough (1912)*short
- A Guilty Conscience (1913)*short
- An Accidental Dentist (1913)*short
- Wild Man for a Day (1913)*short
- Mr. Jinks Buys a Dress (1913)*short
- Such an Appetite (1913)*short
- One on Romance (1913)*short
- The Lost Identity (1913)*short
