= Lycurgus Conner =

American politician and lawyer

Lycurgus J. Conner (November 17, 1909 – May 28, 1963) was a lawyer, judge, and state legislator.

Born in Chicago, Illinois, Conner received his bachelor and law degrees from the University of Chicago. Conner was a lawyer and served as an assistant probate judge. He served in the United States Army during World War II in the judge advocate general office. Conner was a Democrat. Conner served in the Illinois House of Representatives from 1961 until his death from cancer in 1963. He died at his home in Chicago, Illinois.
