= Billy Bowers (actor) =

Actor

For people with similar names see William Bowers (disambiguation)

Billy Bowers was a comedic actor in the United States. He starred in many Siegmund Lubin comedy shorts with Oliver Hardy. He was also in films produced by Arthur Hotaling and directed by Jerold Hevener.

He was announced as a player in All Celtic Films comedies.

== Filmography ==
- Pins Are Lucky (1914)
- The Green Alarm (1914) as Old Man Hokus
- Casey's Birthday (1914) as Mike Dooley
- Who's Boss? (1914) as Clancey
- The Fresh Air Cure (1914) as Pat McFlarrathy
- Good Cider (1914) as Hank
- They Bought a Boat (1914) as Jack Kedge
- The Daddy of Them All (1914) as Chairman
- The Wise Detectives (1914)
- He Wanted Work (1914) as The Boss
- A Tango Tragedy (1914)
- Kidnapping the Kid (1914) as Jake
- Outwitting Dad (1914)as Mr. Gross
- The Crazy Clock Maker (1915), a Jerold Hevener film
- What a Cinch (1915) as Cohen, the Pawnbroker
- The Prize Baby (1915) as Boots
- A Terrible Tragedy (1916) as Professor Foddletop
- It Happened in Pikesville (1916) as Vimless Victor
- Belinda's Bridal Breakfast (1916)
