= Jerold T. Hevener =

American actor

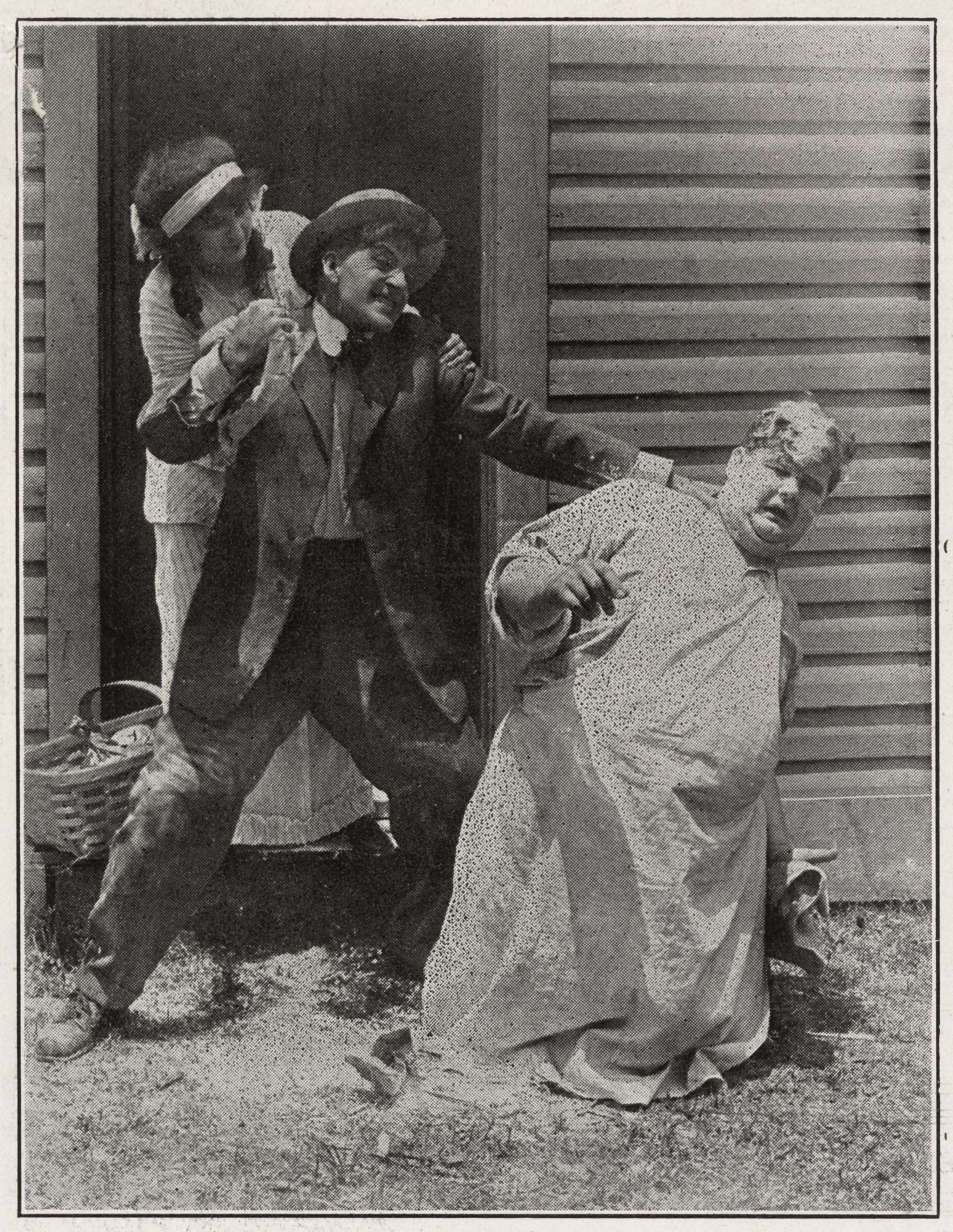
- Still from Jealous James with Marguerite Ne Moyer, Hevener, and Oliver Hardy
- Born: April 30, 1873; Philadelphia, Pennsylvania, US
- Died: April 13, 1947 (aged 73); New Brunswick, New Jersey
- Occupations: Actor and director
- Years active: 1912–1917

Jerold T. Hevener (April 30, 1873 – April 13, 1947) was an American film actor and director. He appeared in 36 films and directed a further 18 between 1912 and 1917. He was born in Philadelphia, Pennsylvania. He was married to the actress Grace Clack. He died at Middlesex General Hospital in New Jersey in 1947.

== Selected filmography ==
=== As an actor ===
- A Terrible Tragedy (1916)
- Edison Bugg's Invention (1916)
- All for a Girl (1915) as Count Barony
- Her Choice (1915)
- Matilda's Legacy (1915)
- A Lucky Strike (1915)
- Cupid's Target (1915)
- What He Forgot (1915)
- Jealous James (1914)
- A Fool There Was (1914)
- He Won a Ranch (1914)
- Building a Fire (1914)
- A Prize Package (1912)
- The Widow Casey's Return (1912)
- The Dream of a Moving Picture Director (1912)

=== As a director ===
- It Happened in Pikersville (1916)
- A Terrible Tragedy (1916)
- Edison Bugg's Invention (1916)
- The Crazy Clock Maker (1915)
- The Prize Baby (1915)
- Cupid's Target (1915)
- What He Forgot (1915)
- The Soubrette and the Simp (1914)
- The Smuggler's Daughter (1914)
- The Female Cop (1914)
