= Mattie Edwards =

American vaudeville and silent film actress

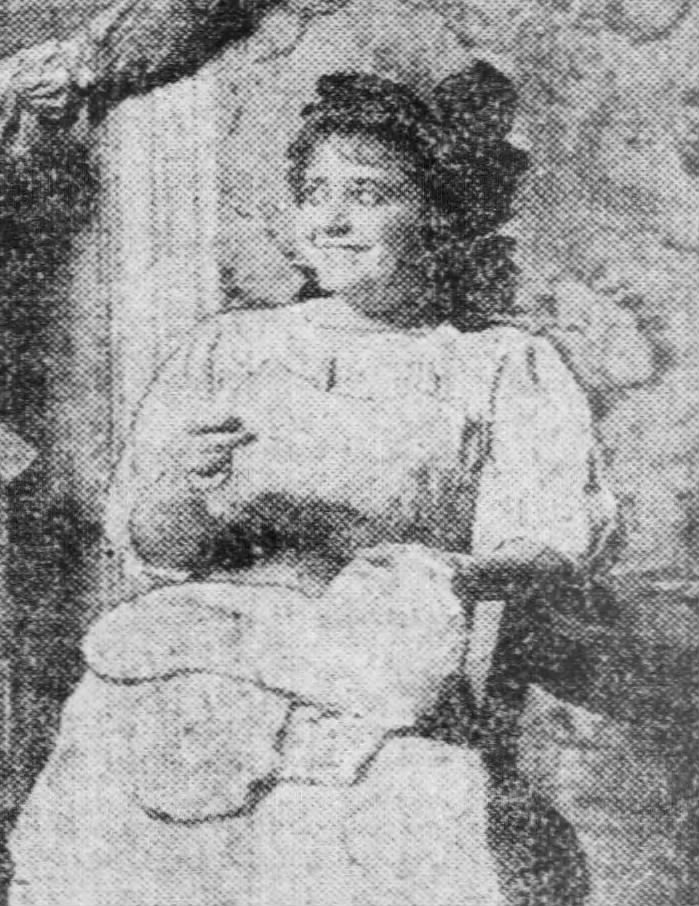
- Edwards c. 1911
- Born: 1866
- Died: 1944 (aged 77–78); Los Angeles County, California, U.S.
- Other names: Hattie Edwards; Martha Mattie Settle
- Occupation: Actress
- Years active: 1887–1937
- Known for: Theatre and film productions
- Notable work: The Round Up (1911); Oh, Boy (1919); Within Our Gates (1920); The Brute (1920)

Mattie Edwards (1866–1944) was an American actress who appeared in vaudeville theatre shows and early silent film productions from the 1880s through the 1930s. An African-American, she grew up in Fort Smith, Arkansas and spent her early life as a Deputy Marshal for the town. Later, she joined the P. G. Lowery minstrel group and then films produced by Essanay Studios. She moved between multiple film studios in the years following, including Williams and Walker Co. films in the 1900s, Lubin Motion Picture Company and Ebony Film Company films in the 1910s, before ending her major roles in Comstock-Elliot company and Oscar Micheaux films in the 1920s. She had several smaller film roles and ongoing theatre roles in the decades after, before dying in 1944 at the age of 78.

== Career ==
While spending her childhood in the American frontier, Edwards was appointed a Deputy Marshal at the age of 16 for the town of Fort Smith, Arkansas. As a part of the fort's criminal court at the time, she assisted in the Dalton Gang's arrest. Her earliest theatre performances were appearances in P. G. Lowery's minstrel group beginning in 1887. The first film debut for Edwards was in the silent film era with Ben Turpin while he still worked out of a loft at Essanay Studios. She also starred as the leading chorus member for Williams and Walker Co. films, particularly in their 1903 production of In Dahomey. She was also highly noted in the 1911–1912 production of The Roundup by Klaw and Erlanger.

Edwards joined the Lubin Motion Picture Company from 1913 to 1915 as the female lead for their productions and fully "colored" cast, frequently being paired up with John "Junk" Edwards as her accompanying male lead. After the Lubin Company's closure, she joined the Griffin Sisters theatre tour in 1917 as the leading contralto. She then joined theatrical productions made by the Ebony Film Company in 1918. For the 1919–1920 run of Oh Boy, Edwards joined a special theatre group formed by the Comstock-Elliot company. That same year, she featured in Oscar Micheaux films including Within Our Gates and The Brute. After, she moved to Los Angeles and occasionally starred in more minor film roles in the following two decades.

== Theatre ==
- The Candy Kid (1908)
- The Virginian as Mrs. Henry
- Checkers as Aunt Deb
- As Ye Sow as Mrs. St. John
- The Round Up (1911) as Josephine
- Getting Her Rights (1915) as Marguerite Smith
- My Killarney Rose (1916) as Nora Donovan
- Mrs. Wiggs of the Cabbage Patch (1918) as Mrs. Schultz
- Oh, Boy (1919) as Mrs. Carter
- Ladies Night (1923)
- Why The Bachelor? (1924)
- Seduction (1925)
- The Devil Within (1927)
- This World and the Next (1929) as Rosie
- The Bird of Flame (1930)

== Filmography ==
- Zeb, Zack and the Zulus (1913), a Lubin film
- Mandy's Chicken Dinner (1914) as Aunt Mandy
- Sam and the Bully (1914) as Mattie
- Swami Sam (1914) as Mattie
- Coon Town Suffragettes (1914) as Mandy Jackson
- The Tale of a Chicken (1914)
- The Rise of the Johnsons (1914)
- He Said He Could Act (1914)
- He Was Bad (1914)
- Rastus Knew It Wasn't (1914) as Nita Nonenti
- Just A Note (1914)
- The Haunted Attic (1915)
- The Rakoon Hose Company (1915)
- It Happened on Washday (1915)
- The Undertaker's Daughter (1915)
- Black Art (1915)
- Father Said He'd Fix It (1915)
- In Zululand (1915) as Queen Cocoa
- A New Way To Win (1915)
- Under a Barrel (1916)
- Good Luck in Old Clothes (1918)
- Within Our Gates (1920) as Jasper Landry's wife
- The Brute (1920)
- Give Us the Night (1936) as Elena
- Champagne Waltz (1937)

== Personal life ==
Edwards married Edward Settle and changed her personal name to Martha Mattie Settle. She died in 1944 at the age of 78.
