= Epes W. Sargent =

American critic (1872–1938)

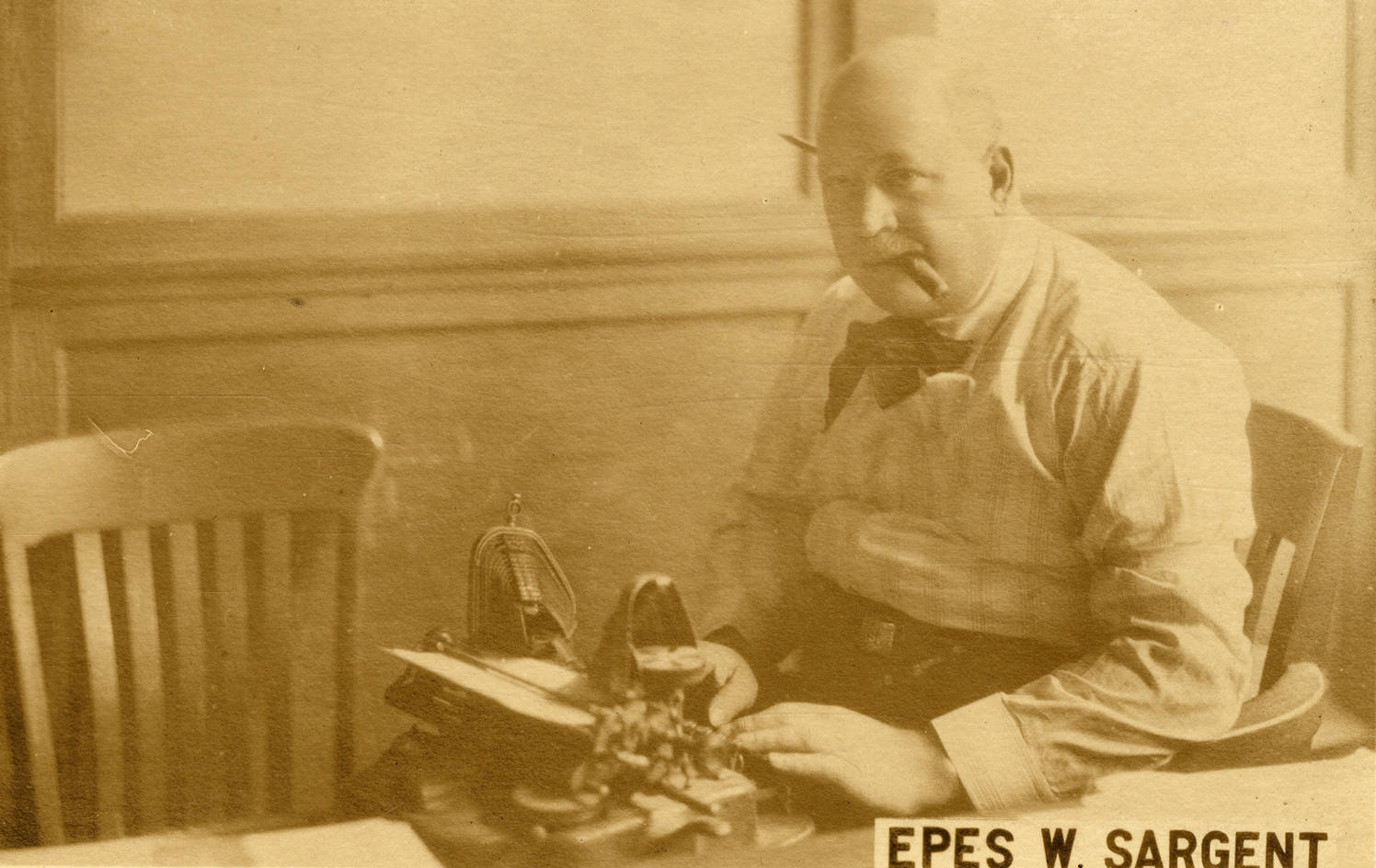
- Born: August 21, 1872; Nassau
- Died: December 6, 1938 (aged 66); New York City

Epes Winthrop Sargent (August 21, 1872 – December 6, 1938) was an American vaudeville critic who wrote under the pen-names Chicot and Chic. He was also a screenwriter.

He was considered "one of vaudeville's most influential critics and commentators".

== Early life ==
He was born in Nassau, Bahamas on August 21, 1872, and moved to the United States in 1878 with his parents.

== Career ==
He first worked as a critic for the New York paper, the Daily Mercury. In the 1890s, he joined the New York Morning Telegraph.

He claimed to have critiqued the first motion picture offered in a theatre, becoming a film fan in the process." In 1905, when Variety began publication, he joined them as their first reviewer and wrote for them intermittently until his death.

In 1911, he became a staff writer for The Moving Picture World. They serialized his Technique of the Photoplay, which was soon published as a book.

In 1914–1915 he wrote the stories for a large number of split-reel and one-reel silent comedies produced by Arthur Hotaling at the Jacksonville, Florida, studio of the Lubin Manufacturing Company, which included the earliest screen appearances of Oliver Hardy.

He died from a stomach hemorrhage in New York City on December 6, 1938.

== Selected works ==
- Making a Sister, a Mock Initiation for Ladies (1910)
- Technique of the Photoplay (1913)
- Picture Theatre Advertising (1915)
