= A Thief in Paradise (1925 film) =

1925 film

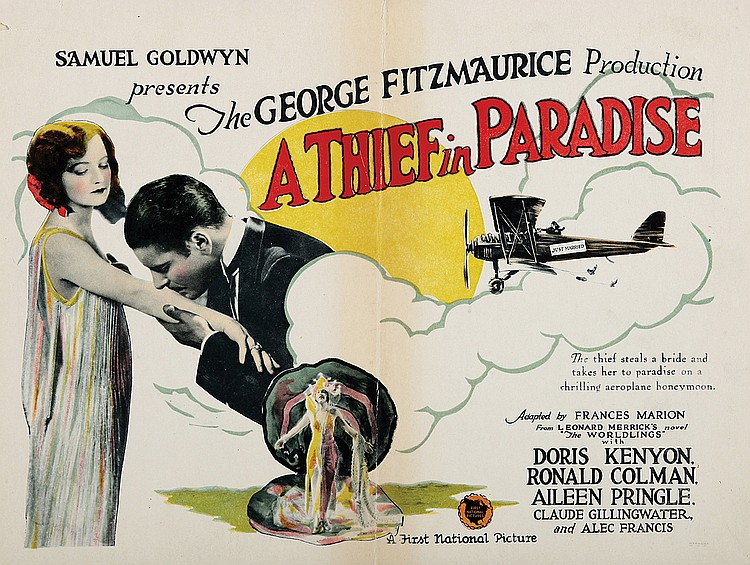
- Lobby card
- Directed by: George Fitzmaurice
- Written by: Frances Marion
- Based on: The Worldlings by Leonard Merrick
- Produced by: George Fitzmaurice; Samuel Goldwyn
- Starring: Doris Kenyon; Ronald Colman; Aileen Pringle
- Cinematography: Arthur C. Miller
- Edited by: Stuart Heisler
- Production company: Samuel Goldwyn Productions
- Distributed by: Associated First National
- Release date: January 18, 1925 (USA)
- Running time: 8 reels
- Country: United States
- Language: Silent (English intertitles)

A Thief in Paradise is a 1925 American silent drama film produced by Samuel Goldwyn, directed by George Fitzmaurice, and adapted by Frances Marion from Leonard Merrick's 1900 novel The Worldlings.

== Plot ==
Maurice Blake is a beachcomber and a pearl diver. Philip Jardine is the wayward son of a San Francisco millionaire, Noel Jardine. Both men are living on a Samoan island. During a dive, the two men fight over a pearl. During the fight, Jardine is attacked and killed by a shark. After his death, Rosa Carmino, a Samoan woman, informs Blake that she has a letter from Jardine's wealthy father, urging him to return to San Francisco. The envelope containing the letter includes $500 to pay for transportation. Carmino, knowing that Jardine's father has never seen his fully grown son, implores Blake to impersonate him. The two thieves, as they are alluded to in the movie's title, arrive in San Francisco and are welcomed by the Jardine family. Soon, Blake falls in love with Helen. Carmino, jealous of the affair, is paid off by Blake to maintain her silence. However, after Blake marries Helen, Carmino tells Helen the true story. Blake admits the truth to Helen and despondent, tries to kill himself. Helen, in love with Blake, refuses to leave him and instead nurses him back to health. As the movie ends, the elder Jardine improbably accepts Blake as his step son and Carmino returns to her native island. A feature of the film is a polo match between two teams of women, one team composed of blondes and another team composed of brunettes.

== Cast ==
- Doris Kenyon as Helen Saville
- Ronald Colman as Maurice Blake
- Aileen Pringle as Rosa Carmino
- Claude Gillingwater as Noel Jardine
- Alec B. Francis as Bishop Saville
- John Patrick as Ned Whalen
- Charles Youree as Philip Jardine
- Etta Lee as Rosa's Maid
- Lon Poff as Jardine's Secretary
- Nita Cavalier as a blonde polo player (uncredited)
- Betsy Ann Hisle as Little Girl (uncredited)
- Lillian Knight as a brunette polo player (uncredited)

== Production ==
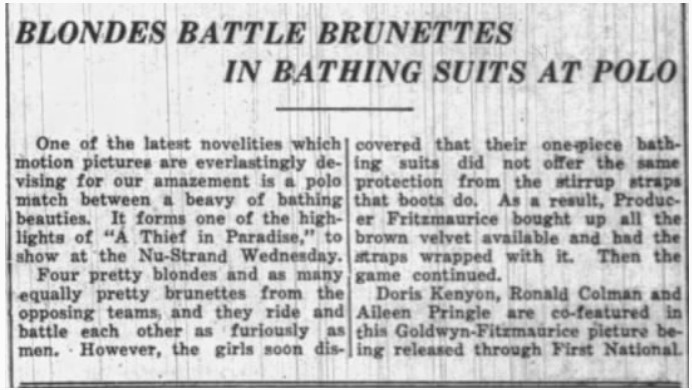
Review for the 1925 movie A Thief in Paradise, highlighting a polo match between blonde and brunette women in bathing suits

The movie was praised by critics for its filming of the underwater fight scene between Blake and Jardine, an impressive technological feat at the time the movie was made, as well for its lavish sets.

Another scene that captured the attention of critics was a polo match, organized by the hosts of a garden party, that featured a team of barefoot blondes wearing one piece bathing suits playing a team of brunettes attired in the same manner.

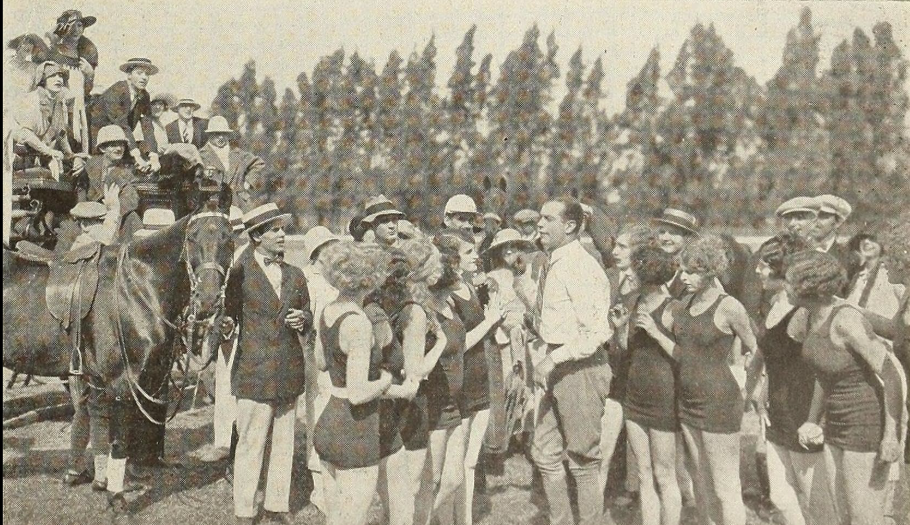
John Patrick instructs the blonde and brunette polo teams before the match

”A feature of this chapter is a polo game played by women in bathing suits. The guests are all the more thrilled by making it a contest between blondes and brunettes. Now this may be wandering away from the narrative, but who will say such a game lacks interest?”

The director, George Fitzmaurice, said in an interview after the movie was completed, that he was surprised at the athleticism of brunettes compared to blondes whom he had long regarded as athletically superior to dark haired women.

== Preservation ==
With no prints of A Thief in Paradise located in any film archives, it is a lost film. However, the stock footage company Producers Library has a 2-minute fragment of the film available for viewing on its site.

== See also ==
- List of lost films
- Blonde versus brunette rivalry
- The Unholy Garden (*also directed by Fitzmaurice and starring Colman)
