= Behind the Times =

Behind the Times may refer to:

- "Behind the Times"', a short story by Arthur Conan Doyle in the 1894 collection Round the Red Lamp
- Behind the Times (film), a 1911 short film
- Behind the Times (EP), by AFI of which 500 copies were released
