= Just Jim =

Just Jim may refer to:

- Just Jim (1915 film), a 1915 American film
- Just Jim (2015 film), a 2015 British film
