= Lillian Knight =

Lillian Knight may refer to:

- Lillian Knight (born 1883) (1883–1946), American western star and silent film actress
- Lillian Knight (silent film actress), American actress who appeared in silent films
