= Lillian Knight (born 1883) =

American actress (1883–1946)

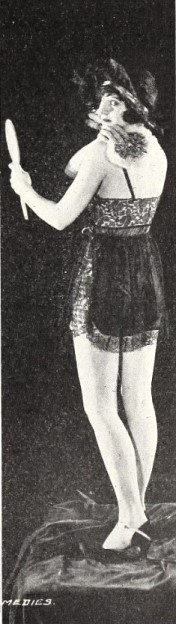
- Born: Lillian Unold; March 23, 1883; Milwaukee, Wisconsin, US
- Died: May 16, 1946 (aged 63); Pomona, California, US
- Other names: Lillian Dorris
- Occupation(s): performer, actress

Lillian Knight (née Unold) (March 23, 1883 – May 16, 1946) was an American western star and silent film actress. An obituary called her "the First Film Queen of the West."

== Early life and background ==
She was born Lillian E. Unold in Milwaukee, Wisconsin. When she was sixteen, she volunteered to ride a bronco side saddle when Tiger Bill's Wild West show was at Pabst Park. She won a cash prize and a contract with William Dickey, the show's owner. She was billed as the world's greatest woman rider. She performed in the 101 Ranch, Tiger Bill, Pawnee Bill, and Buffalo Bill shows. She toured the country and rode wild horses; she became a "crack shot" and performed with Annie Oakley.

== Film career ==
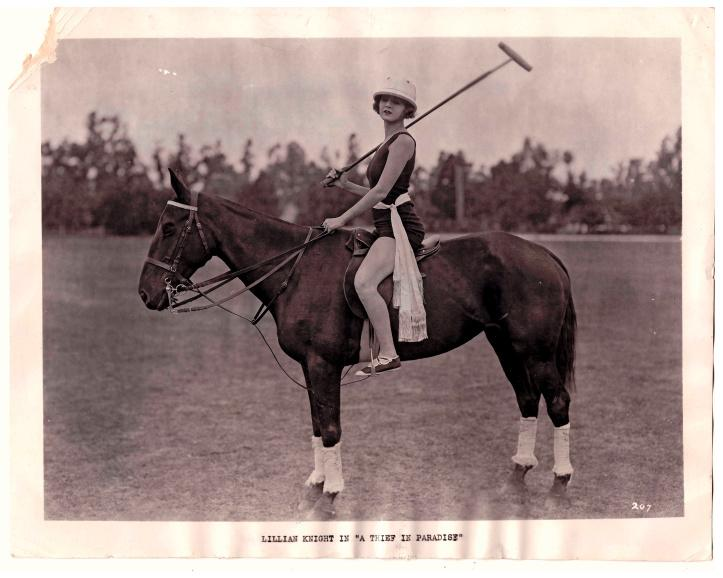
Knight in polo gear, while filming A Thief in Paradise

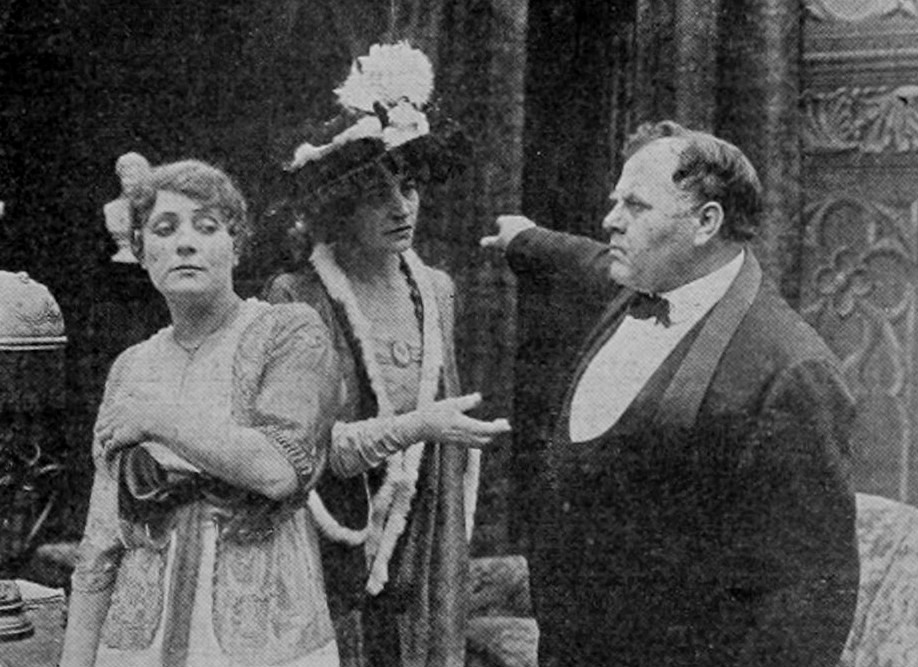
Knight (centre) in The Jilt (1915)

Knight came to California in 1906. She lived in Pasadena until five years before her death.

She performed in films under the name Lillian Knight. Two of her early films were Custer's Last Fight and The Deserter. Later she worked in Tom Mix films. She was in an accident in 1913 that stalled her career. She did not walk unassisted for four years following the accident.

Leveraging her horse riding skills, in 1925, Knight performed as a polo player in A Thief in Paradise, a film that featured a polo match between blonde and brunette women.

== Personal life and death ==
Knight was once engaged to Ken Maynard. At the time of her death on May 16, 1946, in Pomona, California, she was known as Mrs. Lillian E. Dorris. She died at Pomona Valley Community Hospital. She was survived by her husband, William Dorris.

== Selected filmography ==
- Custer's Last Fight (1912)
- The Deserter (1912)
- The Silent Way (1914)
- The Resolve (1915)
- High Cost of Flirting (1915)
- The Jilt (1915)
- Margy of the Foothills (1916)
- The Silken Spider (1916)
- A Thief in Paradise (1925)
