= The Invaders (1912 film) =

1912 film

- Advertisement for film
- Directed by: Francis Ford; Thomas H. Ince
- Written by: C. Gardner Sullivan (scenario)
- Produced by: Thomas H. Ince
- Starring: Art Acord; William Eagle Shirt; Francis Ford
- Cinematography: Ray C. Smallwood
- Distributed by: Mutual Film
- Release date: November 29, 1912 (United States)
- Running time: 41 mins. (2004 National Film Preservation Foundation print)
- Country: United States
- Languages: Silent; English intertitles

The Invaders

The Invaders is a 1912 American silent Western film directed by Francis Ford and Thomas H. Ince. The movie tells the story of broken treaty between a Sioux tribe and the US by railroad surveyors.

== Plot ==
The film opens with Colonel James Bryson and the US army discussing a treaty with the Sioux people. The treaty reads "And in consideration of the above lands being ceded to the United States, the said government will forbid the settlement of the remaining tribal lands of the Sioux nation." All parties agree to and sign the treaty.

We then meet Lieutenant White and Col. Bryson's daughter, who see the men leaving the administrative hall after signing the treaty.

The film then cuts to 1 year later. Colonel James Bryson receives a letter from General Thomas Butler of the Department of the Platte, telling him that the surveying corps of the Transcontinental Railroad will soon reach him and will require a military escort. The surveyors arrive and decline the offered escort and begin their work.

We cut to the Sioux tribe where we see the chief's daughter, Sky Star, rejecting the advances of a Sioux man. The man brings two horses to the chief to pay as a dowry, and the chief accepts the courtship.

The next day, Sky Star is seen traveling the wilderness. The surveyors notice the woman, and one of them confronts her. She flees at first but then the two seem to take a romantic interest in each other. The Sioux man who previously asked for her hand sees the two, and follows the man back to the surveyors corps.

The man tells the Sioux chief of the railroad surveyors encroaching on his land, which the film labels an invasion. The chief shows the treaty to his daughter. The chief and his men head to the US army administrative hall to discuss the matter. The army seems to dismiss their concerns as invalid.

The Sioux meet with a Cheyennes tribe and persuade them to join in their uprising. The chief shows the treaty to the Cheyenne before ripping it up and throwing it to the ground.

We cut back to Lieut. White who asks for and receives the Colonel's consent to marry his daughter.

At the Sioux camp, Sky Star overhears their plan to massacre the settlers. Having fallen for the surveyor she met earlier, she rushes to warn the whites, but falls off her horse, preventing her from reaching them in time.

The Sioux and Cheyenne then start their attack. First shooting an armed surveyor who is collecting water from a creek. The shot man returns to the surveying corps to warn them before dying. The surveyors start fighting back, and a battle ensues.

Sky Star arrives at the surveyor's post an hour later, too late to warn them and injured from her fall. She heads to the army outpost and arrives at dawn. By this time the surveyors have been killed by the tribe.

Upon hearing Sky Star's account, the fort's soldiers are round up and head for the tribe. The colonel's daughter takes care of an injured Sky Star.

The Sioux signal to their Cheyenne allies and plan an ambush. The US military arrives on horseback and fall into the ambush, surrounded by Sioux and Cheyenne who attack them from higher ground.

The tribes then attack the outpost now that the military's numbers have been reduced. The tribe sets fire to the fort's telegraph pole, before a distress message can be sent out. Lieut. White rides to the next fort seeking aid while the battle rages on.

The colonel's daughter asks for help as Sky Star's health falters, and the colonel plans to stall until reinforcements arrive. Waving white flags, the colonel tells the Sioux chief that they are holding Sky Star hostage, and that they will kill her if they continue to attack.

The chief asks to hear his daughter speak as proof that she is there. The colonel and his daughter go to retrieve Sky Star from her sick bed only to find her dead. The colonel then tells the chief that they do not have his daughter, and the fighting resumes.

The colonel finds himself with one bullet remaining, and his daughter begs him to kill her. Just before he is about to shoot, Lieut. White returns with reinforcements. Lieut. White and the colonel's daughter reunite, and the battle is won by the US military.

== Cast ==
- Art Acord as Telegrapher
- William Eagle Shirt as The Sioux Chief
- Francis Ford as Colonel James Bryson
- Ethel Grandin as Colonel Bryson's Daughter
- Ann Little as Sky Star
- Ray Myers as Lieutenant White

== Production ==
Thomas H. Ince rented the Millers Bros. 101 Ranch Real Wild West Show, to lend an "authenticity" to the film. The show's cowboys, buffalo, and Oglala Sioux were used in several of Ince's films (notably, War on the Plains). Ince brought the traveling show to a leased area in Santa Monica meant to mimic the Dakotas that would come to be known as "Inceville".

== Availability ==
The film was preserved by the Library of Congress and released by the National Film Preservation Foundation as part of the DVD box set More Treasures from American Film Archives, 1894-1931 in 2004.

== Reception ==
Writing for The Moving Picture World in 1912, Louis Reeves Harrison called the film "an absorbing picture of dramatic conflict . . . the top of its kind, from an artistic point of view", and expressed that the cinematography was similar "to the best photography as applied to still life, with far greater emotional effects".

University of California, Davis professor Scott Simmon wrote of The Invaders "Even with its straight-forward visual style, it manages to dramatize quite complexly the conflicts and guilts of American history. The result is arguably the first great Western".
