= When Lincoln Paid =

- Directed by: Francis Ford
- Written by: William Clifford
- Starring: Jack Conway; Francis Ford; Charles Edler; Ethel Grandin
- Distributed by: Mutual Film
- Release date: January 31, 1913
- Running time: 30 minutes
- Country: United States
- Languages: Silent; English intertitles

When Lincoln Paid is a 1913 American short silent historical drama film written by William Clifford and directed by Francis Ford, who also appears in the film as Abraham Lincoln. Ford portrayed Lincoln in nine silent films; all are now lost except for this one and The Heart of Lincoln.

== Plot ==
The mother of a dead Union soldier attempts to convince President Lincoln to pardon a similarly condemned Confederate soldier whose unjust conviction was the result of her vindictive scheme.

== Cast ==
- Francis Ford as Abraham Lincoln
- Jack Conway as Bob Porter
- Charles Edler as Confederate General Porter (billed as Charles Elder)
- Ethel Grandin as Mrs. Barnes
- Joe King as John Wade
- Grace Cunard as John Wade's Sweetheart

== Background ==
This was one of many films from the 1910s focusing on Lincoln's well-known practice of pardoning young Civil War soldiers condemned to die, if any extenuating circumstances might have been involved.

== Preservation status ==
When Lincoln Paid was thought to be lost until a contractor who was demolishing a barn in Nelson, New Hampshire discovered a 35mm Monarch projector and seven reels of film. Among the seven reels was a nitrate print of When Lincoln Paid. The contractor donated the reels to the Keene State College Film Society. When Lincoln Paid was restored and was screened at Keene State College in April 2010. The 35mm copy of the film was gifted by Keene State College to George Eastman House, where it is now held.

== See also ==
- List of rediscovered films
