= Ethel Grandin =

American silent film actress (1894–1988)

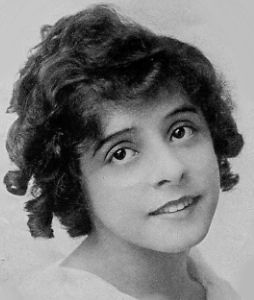
- Grandin, c. 1916
- Born: March 3, 1894; New York City, U.S.
- Died: September 27, 1988 (aged 94); Woodland Hills, California, U.S.
- Other name: Ethel Smallwood
- Occupations: Actor, producer in silent films
- Years active: 1911–1922

Ethel Grace Grandin Smallwood (March 3, 1894 – September 27, 1988) was an American silent film actress in the 1910s and 1920s.

== Early life ==
Grandin was born in New York City, the daughter of Edward Siebree Grandin and Julia G. Parker Grandin. She started as a child actress for Chauncey Olcott's touring company. She appeared on stage with Joseph Jefferson in a 1900 adaptation of Rip Van Winkle. She also worked with Edna May and Cecil Spooner, and was featured in vaudeville productions.

== Film career ==
Grandin made her film debut in 1910 working for Carl Laemmle at his Independent Motion Picture Company (IMP) and in 1911 started to work with Thomas Ince, becoming his first leading lady. She moved with Ince to Los Angeles. She returned to working for Laemmle and IMP in Traffic in Souls (1913), which was a big success. In 1914, when she was twenty years old, she and her husband Ray C. Smallwood created their own film company. She made her last film appearance in 1922.

Grandin was known for her physically daring performances on screen. "To be a serial performer, one must have plenty of nerve, and Ethel Grandin has that in abundance," noted a 1917 profile. "She has already jumped off a bridge twice, and once fell three stories from a building into a fire net, refusing to have someone else 'double' for her."

== Partial filmography ==
- Behind the Times (1911)
- The Aggressor (1911)
- The Toss of the Coin (1911)
- War on the Plains (1912)
- The Deserter (1912)
- The Invaders (1912)
- When Lincoln Paid (1913)
- Traffic in Souls (1913)
- Jane Eyre (1914)
- The Adopted Daughter (1914)
- The Crimson Stain Mystery (1916)
- Garments of Truth (1921)
- The Hunch (1921)
- A Tailor-Made Man (1922)

== Personal life ==
Grandin was married to film director Ray Curtis Smallwood from 1912 until his death in 1964. They had a son, Arthur. She lived in the Motion Picture Country House in Woodland Hills, California beginning in 1958, and was the home's longest resident when she died there from natural causes in 1988, at age 94.
