= She Married for Love =

1914 film

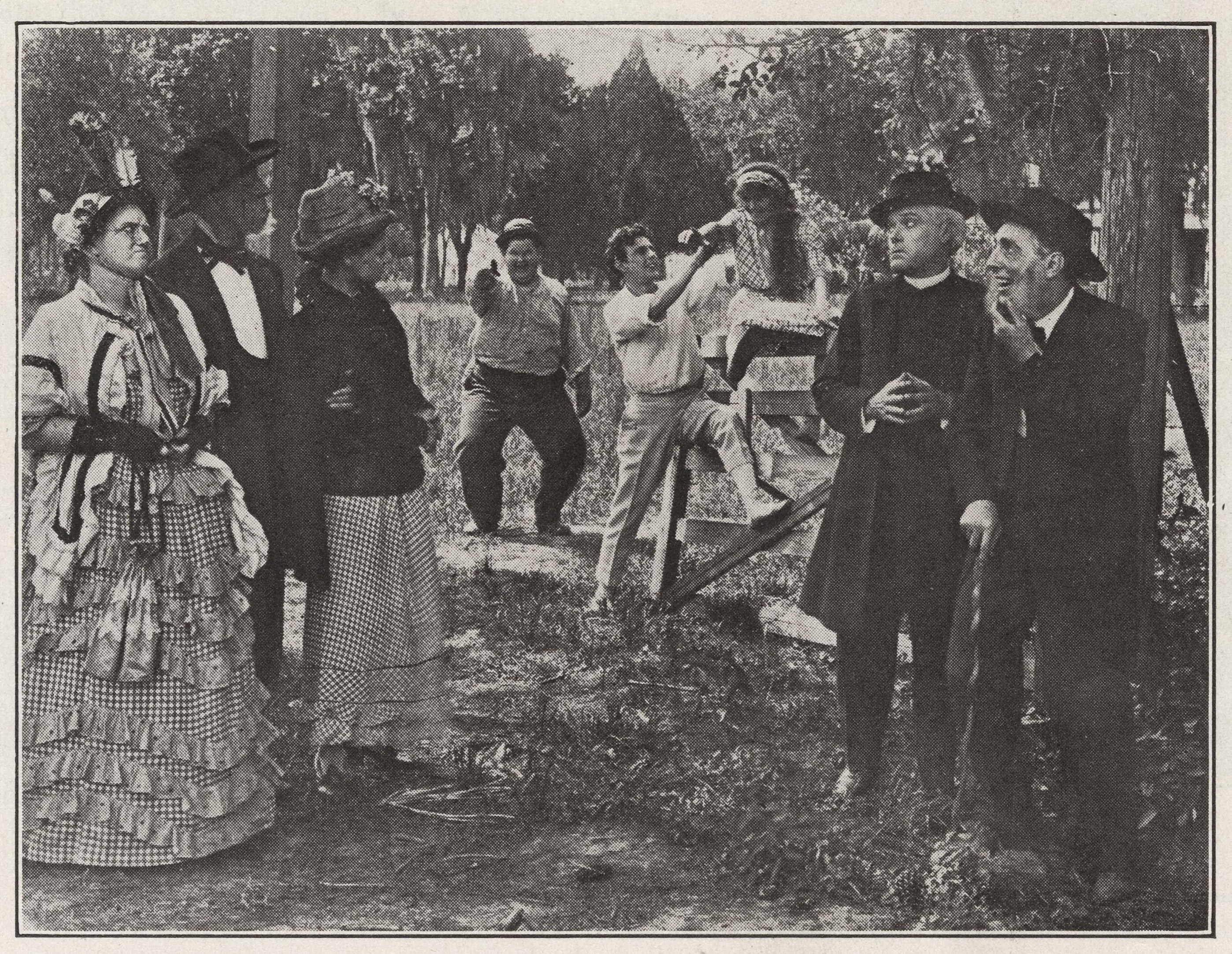
- Publicity still for She Married for Love
- Written by: Epes W. Sargent
- Produced by: Arthur Hotaling
- Starring: Raymond McKee; Eva Bell; Harry Lorraine
- Release date: October 27, 1914
- Running time: 6–8 minutes (c. 600 feet)
- Country: United States
- Languages: Silent film English intertitles

She Married for Love is a 1914 American split-reel silent comedy film produced by the Lubin Manufacturing Company and starring Raymond McKee, Eva Bell, and Harry Lorraine.

== Plot ==
Mrs. Muggs has arranged to marry her young daughter Rose to an aged deacon. When Harry Bounce, an acrobat, rents a room in the Muggs house, Rose falls in love with him and starts practicing to become an acrobat herself. In order to get out of her marriage to the deacon, Rose performs cartwheels and somersaults when they go for a walk, as well as handstands in front of the church, which shocks the minister. When he sees her walking a tightrope on a clothesline, the deacon calls off the wedding and gets engaged to an old maid instead. Her mother kicks Rose out of the house, but forgives her when she send her a check and reports that she is making $250 a week on the stage.

== Cast ==
- Pasqualina DeVoe as Mrs. Muggs
- Eva Bell as Rose Muggs
- Raymond McKee as Harry Bounce
- Harry Lorraine as The Deacon
- Mae Sheppard as The Old Maid
- Oliver Hardy as one of the townspeople (uncredited)

== Production and reception ==
She Married for Love was written by Epes W. Sargent and produced by Arthur Hotaling, the general supervisor of the Jacksonville, Florida unit of the Lubin Manufacturing Company of Philadelphia. It was released by the General Film Company on October 27, 1914. It was a short split-reel comedy, lasting approximately 6–8 minutes, and sharing a single reel of film with a second, unrelated comedy, Love and Title, written by Will Louis and starring James Levering, Mabel Paige, and Vincent de Paschale. Both films were released by the General Film Company on October 27, 1914. She Married for Love was one of a group of short comedies made by the Lubin company in 1914 and early 1915 that include the earliest screen appearances of Oliver Hardy. Unlike many of the immediately preceding films, in which Hardy had a starring role, in She Married for Love he appears only briefly as a bystander. He not credited by name in the Lubin company newsletter, but he can be seen in the background of a promotional still for the film, wearing a straw hat and laughing as the townspeople look askance at the antics of the young lovers.

The film received favorable reviews in the trade papers. The Bioscope called it a "vivacious and quite original comedy, which introduces a clever girl athlete as principal", and the New York Dramatic Mirror wrote that "the laughs in this E. W. Sargent burlesque are chiefly due to the acrobatic proficiency of the two players in the roles of the young lovers. There is enough story to carry the humorous action." The critic for Moving Picture World described it as "a very taking comedy by Epes Winthrop Sargent, that involves a couple of families in numerous cut-a-caper acts with a circus acrobat. Much might be said in favor of this offering; it is really worth the viewing. Eva Bell and Raymond McKee deserve mention." More briefly, Variety considered it "above average" and Motion Picture News observed that it had contained "some good comedy".

== See also ==
- List of American films of 1914
- Oliver Hardy filmography
