= Nita Cavalier =

American actress

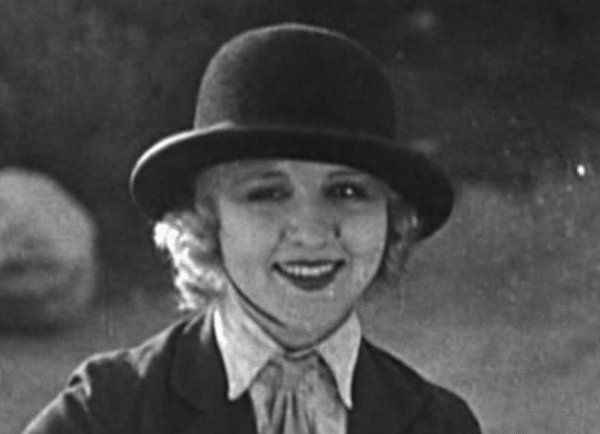
- Born: May 15, 1906; Denver, Colorado
- Died: April 4, 1969 (aged 62); San Diego, California
- Occupation: actress

Nita Cavalier (May 15, 1906 – April 4, 1969) was an American silent film and stage actress.

== Early life ==
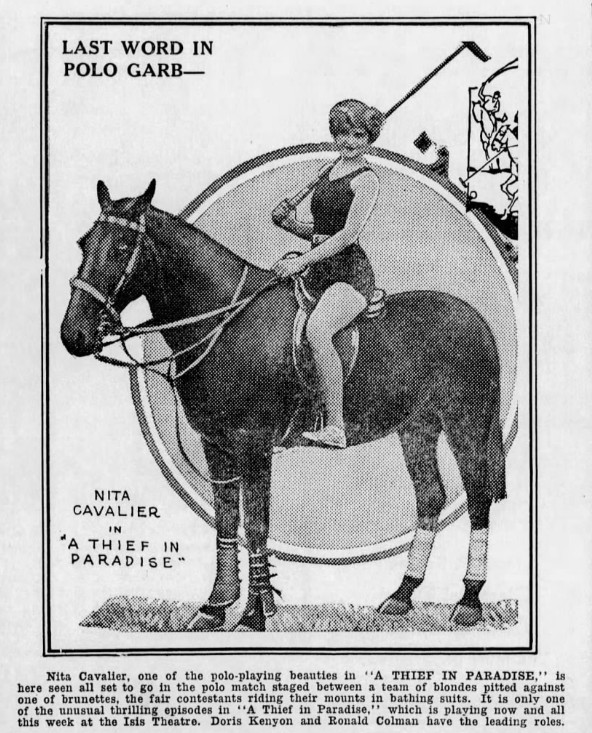
A skilled polo player, Cavalier performed in the 1925 film A Thief in Paradise

Nita Cavalier was born on May 15, 1906, in Denver, Colorado. She moved to Los Angeles, California with her family at the age of one. She attended the Hollywood High School.

== Career ==
Cavalier was a stage actress. In 1928, she performed in Kongo at the Granada Theater in Ontario, California alongside Howard Sinclair. In 1930, she performed in The Bachelor Father at the Garrick Theatre alongside George LaMar.

She acted in silent films such as The Twin Triggers and The Stolen Ranch in 1926, followed by Tearin' Into Trouble and The Prince of Headwaiters in 1927.

Cavalier was a skilled polo player. The blonde actress demonstrated her skills in the sport while performing in the 1925 film A Thief in Paradise, a George Fitzmaurice production that featured a polo match between blonde and brunette women.

== Death ==
She died on April 4, 1969, in San Diego, California.

== Partial filmography ==
- A Thief in Paradise (1925)
- The Coast of Folly (1925)
- The Twin Triggers (1926)
- The Dead Line (1926)
- The Stolen Ranch (1926)
- Tearin' Into Trouble (1927)
- The Prince of Headwaiters (1927)
