= The Deserter (1912 film) =

1912 film

- Directed by: Thomas H. Ince
- Written by: Thomas H. Ince
- Starring: Francis Ford; Ethel Grandin
- Release date: March 15, 1912
- Running time: 20 minutes
- Country: United States
- Languages: Silent; English intertitles

The Deserter is a 1912 American silent black-and-white two-reel Western film written and directed by Thomas H. Ince. It was released March 15, 1912 and starred Francis Ford and Ethel Grandin. The film was screened in December 2006 at the Museum of Modern Art in New York, as part of a retrospective on Thomas H. Ince. The film is available at the Library of Congress.

== Plot ==
The story concerns a soldier who deserts his regiment and encounters a wagon train of settlers. When finding an attack by American Indians is eminent, he returns to his unit in order to elicit help.

== Cast (in credits order) ==
- Francis Ford
- Ethel Grandin
- Harold Lockwood
- J. Barney Sherry
- Ray Myers
- Winnie Baldwin
- Clifford Smith
