= Leatherstocking (serial) =

1924 film

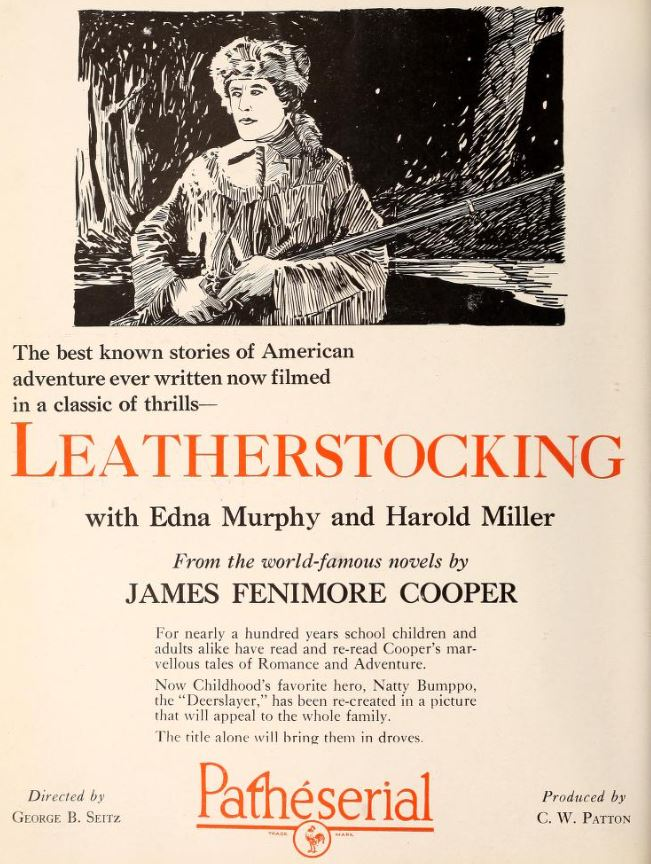
- Advertisement
- Directed by: George B. Seitz
- Written by: James Fenimore Cooper (novel)
- Produced by: C. W. Patton
- Starring: Edna Murphy; Harold Miller
- Distributed by: Pathé Exchange
- Release date: March 23, 1924
- Running time: 10 episodes
- Country: United States
- Language: Silent (English intertitles)

Leatherstocking is a 1924 American silent Western film serial directed by George B. Seitz.

== Cast ==
- Edna Murphy as Judith Hutter
- Harold Miller as Leatherstocking
- Whitehorse as Tom Hutter
- Frank Lackteen as Briarthorn
- Ray Myers as Rivenoak
- James Pierce as Harry March
- Lillian Hall as Hetty Hutter
- David Dunbar as Chingachgook
- Tom Tyler as Indian (credited as Vincent Markowski)
- Emily Barrye as Sumach, The Colonel's Daughter
- Carl D. Bruner (uncredited)

== Chapter titles ==
1. The Warpath
2. The Secret Trail
3. The Hawk's Eyes
4. The Paleface Law
5. Ransom
6. The Betrayal
7. Rivenoak's Revenge
8. Out of the Storm
9. The Panther
10. Mingo Torture

== See also ==
- List of film serials
- List of film serials by studio
