= The Battle of Bull Run (film) =

1913 American film short directed by Francis Ford

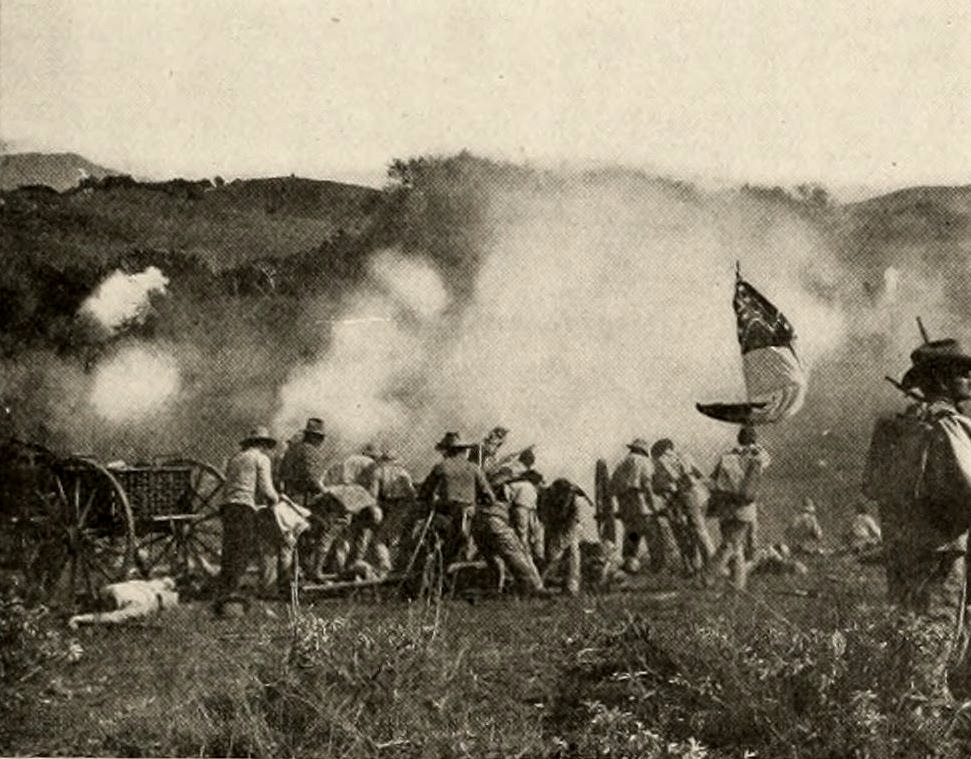
- Film frame
- Directed by: Francis Ford
- Production company: Bison Motion Pictures
- Distributed by: Universal Film Manufacturing Company
- Release date: March 18, 1913 (U.S.)
- Running time: 3 reels (approximately 40 minutes)
- Country: United States

The Battle of Bull Run is a 1913 American historical drama silent black-and-white film directed by Francis Ford. It portrays the First Battle of Bull Run during the American Civil War.

== Plot ==
The film is a historical drama that depicts the First Battle of Bull Run with the plot of the movie centering around a brother and sister, Grace and Harry Myers, who are spies for the United States. The film starts with the Southern and Northern Army fighting and the South gaining an upper hand against the North. This leads to the North's defeat and the army retreating from the battle. When Abraham Lincoln hears of this defeat, he calls for the best secret service agent, Grace Myers, to be sent at once to help her brother find information about the Confederate Army. When Grace gets to the border of United States and the Confederate States, she has to hide in a wagon that is crossing the border so that none of the Confederate soldiers know that she is there. Grace then meets up with Harry and rides with him to the town that they are planning on spying on, with their main goal to be infiltrating the house of the Colonel. The Colonel's job is to handle all dispatches from the Confederate Army. Grace then meets the Colonel's sweetheart, May, at a ball by helping fix May's dress, which Grace purposely ripped. This leads to Grace meeting the Colonel and she becomes an acquaintance of his. Later, Grace has her carriage purposely crash in front of the Colonel's house so that she can get inside the house. Colonel helps her fix her carriage and Grace gets inside his house. He tries to get rid of her before May comes home, but Grace distracts the Colonel long enough so that when May gets home the Colonel has to hide Grace in his office. While Grace is in his office, May tries to warn the Colonel about Grace saying that she was dangerous, but the Colonel doesn't believe her. Grace finds the letters from the South and switches them for fake letters, but she accidentally drops one of the real letters which causes the Colonel to notice. Harry, who was hiding outside the house, is noticed by a servant who tells the Colonel about him and the Colonel believes he is the one who took the letters, so the Colonel saddles up and chases after Harry. They meet each other on the battlefield for the second Battle of Bull Run where they fight. While they fight, Grace watches on and sees Harry and the Colonel fight until the Colonel kills Harry. However, the Colonel is killed by a stray bullet which causes Harry and the Colonel to die side by side. Grace escapes to the north and gives the letters to United States and she is celebrated as a hero for the mission. Grace, filled with guilt and sadness, returns home where one night she is awoken by the spirits of the Colonel and Harry who lead her to the battlefield where they died blaming Grace for their deaths. Grace then wakes up realizing it was a nightmare, and she decides to go downstairs. When she gets to the stairs she passes out and falls down the stairs and dies.

== Cast ==
- William Clifford as The Southern Colonel
- Victoria Forde as May - the Colonel's Sweetheart
- Grace Cunard as Grace Myers
- Ray Myers as Harry Myers
- Francis Ford as Abraham Lincoln

== Reception ==
The Moving Picture World reviewed the movie on March 15, three days before the film release. They said the movie was overall really good and well made, but the ending was terrible because it punishes Grace for helping the north when the death of the Colonel and Harry was not her fault. The reviewer, H.C. Judson, wished the ending was happier and upbeat to fall align with the heroism of Grace.
