= Harry Lorraine (American actor) =

American actor (1873–1934)

Harry Loraine (aka Lorraine)
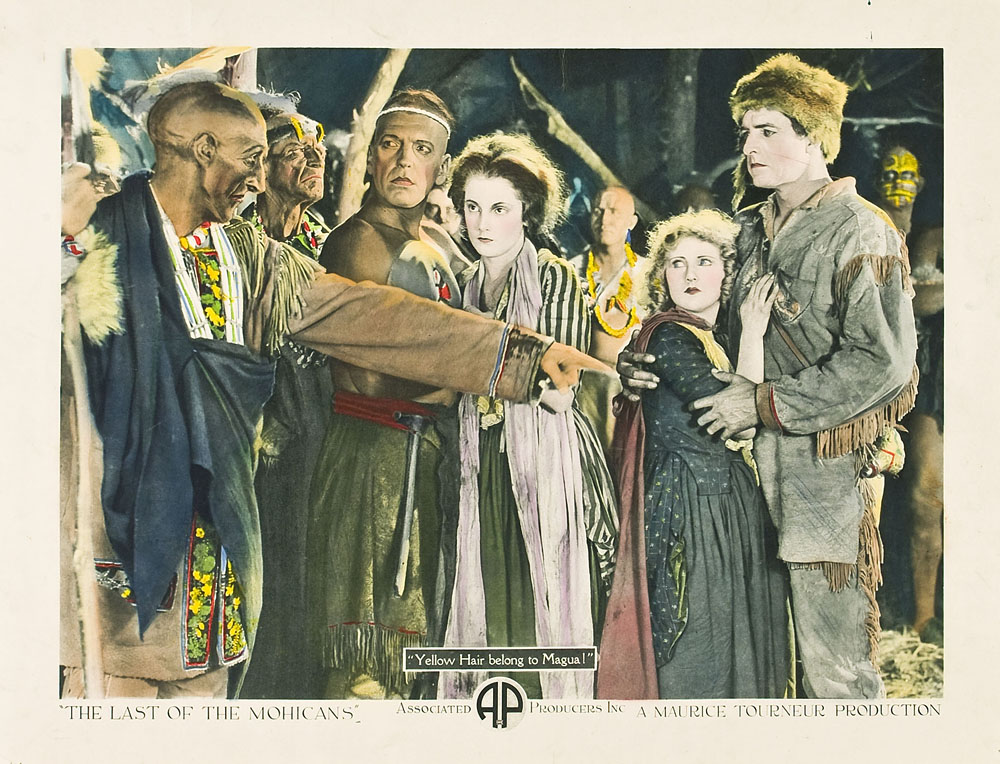
- Loraine as the scout (at right) in The Last of the Mohicans (1920)
- Born: September 14, 1873; Cincinnati Ohio, US
- Died: August 22, 1934 (aged 60)
- Occupation: Actor
- Years active: 1913–1930

Harry Loraine (aka Lorraine) (September 14, 1873 – 1934) was an American silent film actor. He appeared in more than 60 films between 1913 and 1930.

== Selected filmography ==
- Who's Boss? (1914)
- She Married for Love (1914)
- Kidnapping the Kid (1914)
- The Daddy of Them All (1914)
- Weary Willie's Rags (1914)
- They Looked Alike (1915)
- Spaghetti a la Mode (1915)
- Cupid's Target (1915)
- Shoddy the Tailor (1915)
- Who Stole the Doggies? (1915)
- Cannibal King (1915)
- Just Jim (1915)
- It Happened in Pikesville (1916)
- The Hawk's Trail (1919)
- The Last of the Mohicans (1920)
- The Lure of Egypt (1921)
- A Certain Rich Man (1921)
- The Hunch (1921)
- The Man of the Forest (1921)
- Garments of Truth (1921)
- The Lavender Bath Lady (1922)
- Don't Write Letters (1922)
- Little Eva Ascends (1922)
- Heart's Haven (1922)
- Slave of Desire (1923)
- Siege (1925)
- Ace of Spades (1925)
- Steppin' Out (1925)
- The Vanishing West (1928)
