= Effie Conley =

American dancer and actress (1882–1967)

- Born: November 7, 1882; Massachusetts, U.S.
- Died: August 8, 1967 (aged 84); Van Nuys, California, U.S.
- Occupations: Dancer; actress

Effie Conley (November 7, 1882 – August 8, 1967) was an American dancer and actress who toured the vaudeville circuit with partner Fred Warren and appeared in silent films. Their vaudeville performances were well received.

== Early life and family ==
Conley was born in Massachusetts in 1882. Her sister Ann Conley married Maxwell Karger.

The University of Washington Libraries have a photo of her and Fred Warren from 1916 and in performing attire in 1923. She and her husband were in the 1919 film A Favor to a Friend together.

== Death and legacy ==
Conley died in 1967 in Van Nuys, California.

== Selected filmography ==
- A Favor to a Friend (1919) as Gloria Morning
- Fair and Warmer (1919), as Tessie
- The Four Flusher (1919), as Senora Flora
- Blind Man's Eyes (1919)
- The Walk-Offs (1920), as Caroline Rutherford
- The Best of Luck (1920), as Maid
- The Fatal Hour (1920), as Sally
- Garments of Truth (1921)
