= The Hunch =

1921 film

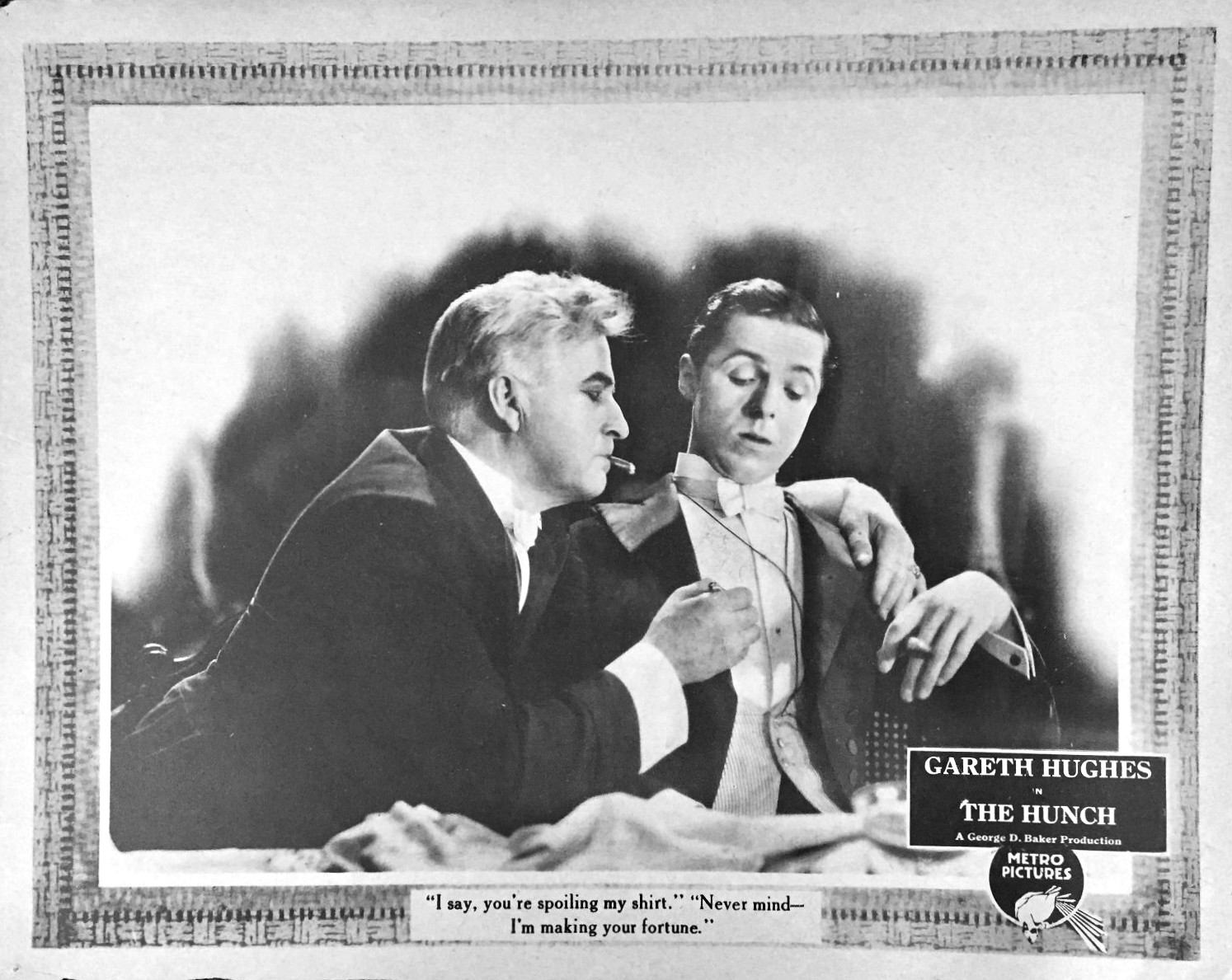
- Directed by: George D. Baker
- Starring: Gareth Hughes; Ethel Grandin; John Steppling
- Cinematography: Rudolph J. Bergquist
- Production company: Sawyer-Lubin Pictures Corporation
- Distributed by: Metro Pictures
- Release date: November 28, 1921
- Running time: 60 minutes
- Country: United States
- Languages: Silent; English intertitles

The Hunch is a 1921 American silent comedy film directed by George D. Baker and starring Gareth Hughes, Ethel Grandin and John Steppling.

== Cast ==
- Gareth Hughes as J. Preston Humphrey
- Ethel Grandin as Barbara Thorndyke
- John Steppling as John C. Thorndyke
- Edward Flanagan as George Taylor
- Harry Lorraine as Sheriff Henry Clay Greene
- Gale Henry as Minnie Stubbs
- William H. Brown as Hodges

== Bibliography ==
- Connelly, Robert B. The Silents: Silent Feature Films, 1910-36, Volume 40, Issue 2. December Press, 1998.
- Munden, Kenneth White. The American Film Institute Catalog of Motion Pictures Produced in the United States, Part 1. University of California Press, 1997.
