= The Dead Line (1926 film) =

1926 film

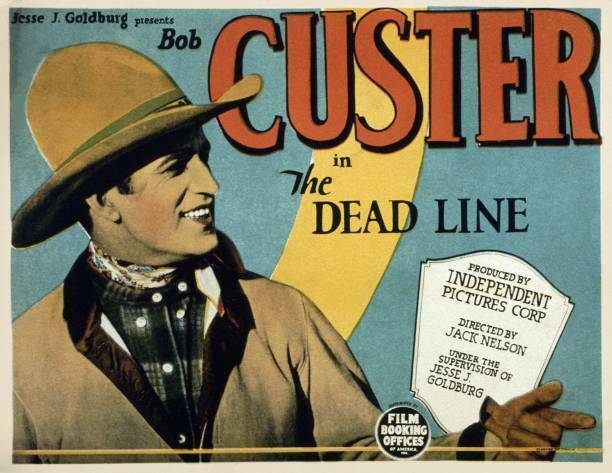
- Directed by: Jack Nelson
- Written by: Barr Cross
- Produced by: Jesse J. Goldburg
- Starring: Bob Custer; Nita Cavalier; Robert McKim
- Cinematography: Arthur Reeves
- Production company: Independent Pictures
- Distributed by: Film Booking Offices of America
- Release date: June 27, 1926
- Running time: 50 minutes
- Country: United States
- Languages: Silent; English intertitles

The Dead Line is a 1926 American silent Western film directed by Jack Nelson and starring Bob Custer, Nita Cavalier and Robert McKim.

== Synopsis ==
Sonora Slim run across a man dying in the desert, who reveals he had discovered a potentially lucrative mine before being shot by a bandit.

== Cast ==
- Bob Custer as Sonora Slim
- Nita Cavalier as Alice Wilson
- Robert McKim as 'Silver Sam' McGee
- Tom Bay as Snake Sneed
- Marianna Moya as Lolita
- Billy Franey as 'Extra' Long
- Gino Corrado as Juan Álavarez

== Preservation ==
With no holdings located in archives, The Dead Line is considered a lost film.

== Bibliography ==
- Connelly, Robert B. The Silents: Silent Feature Films, 1910-36, Volume 40, Issue 2. December Press, 1998.
- Munden, Kenneth White. The American Film Institute Catalog of Motion Pictures Produced in the United States, Part 1. University of California Press, 1997.
