= The Coast of Folly =

1925 film by Allan Dwan

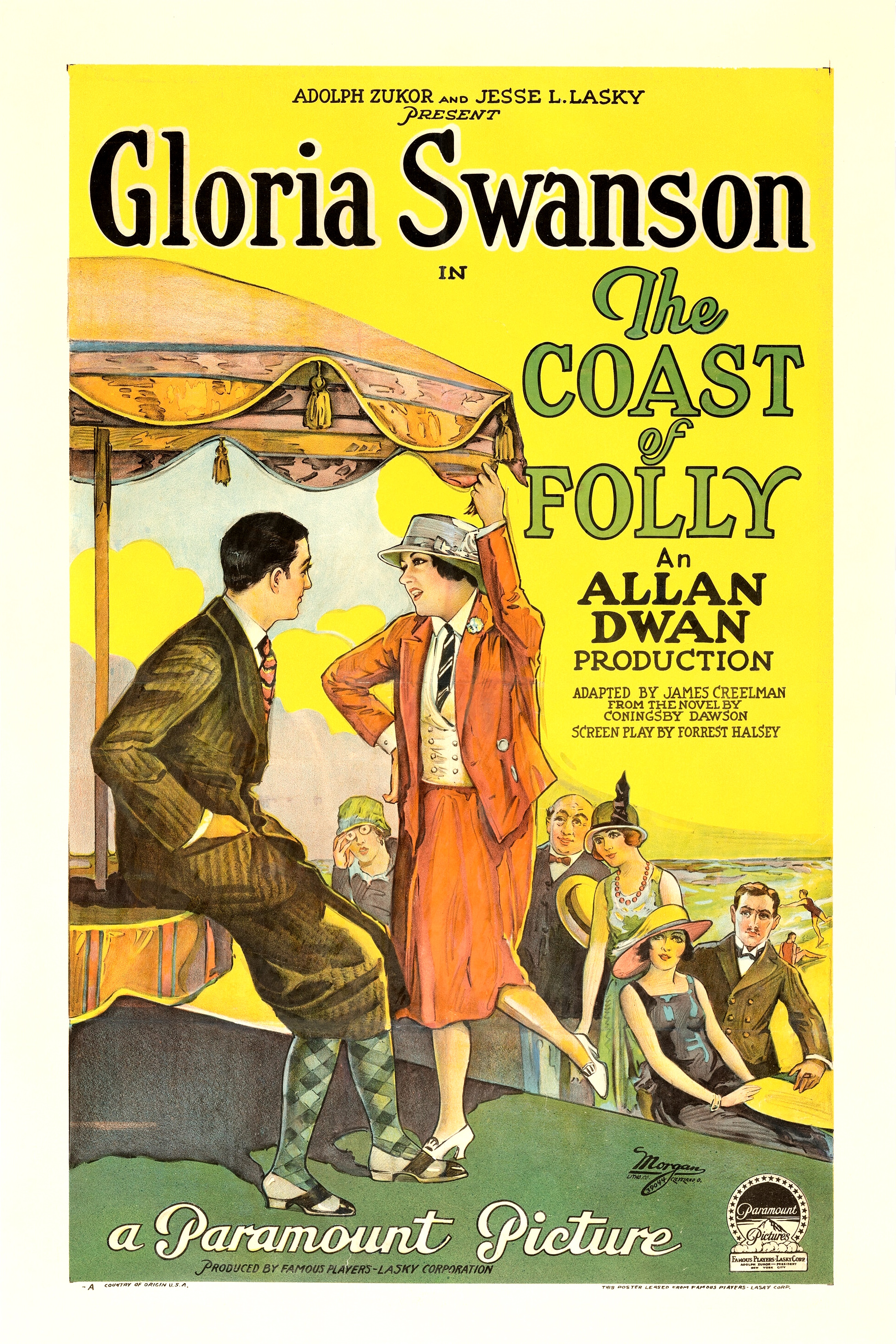
- Theatrical release poster
- Directed by: Allan Dwan
- Written by: James Ashmore Creelman (adaptation); Forrest Halsey
- Based on: The Coast of Folly: A Novel by Coningsby William Dawson
- Produced by: Adolph Zukor; Jesse Lasky; Allan Dwan
- Starring: Gloria Swanson; Dorothy Cumming; Lawrence Gray
- Cinematography: George Webber
- Distributed by: Paramount Pictures
- Release date: September 21, 1925
- Running time: 70 minutes
- Country: United States
- Language: Silent (English intertitles)

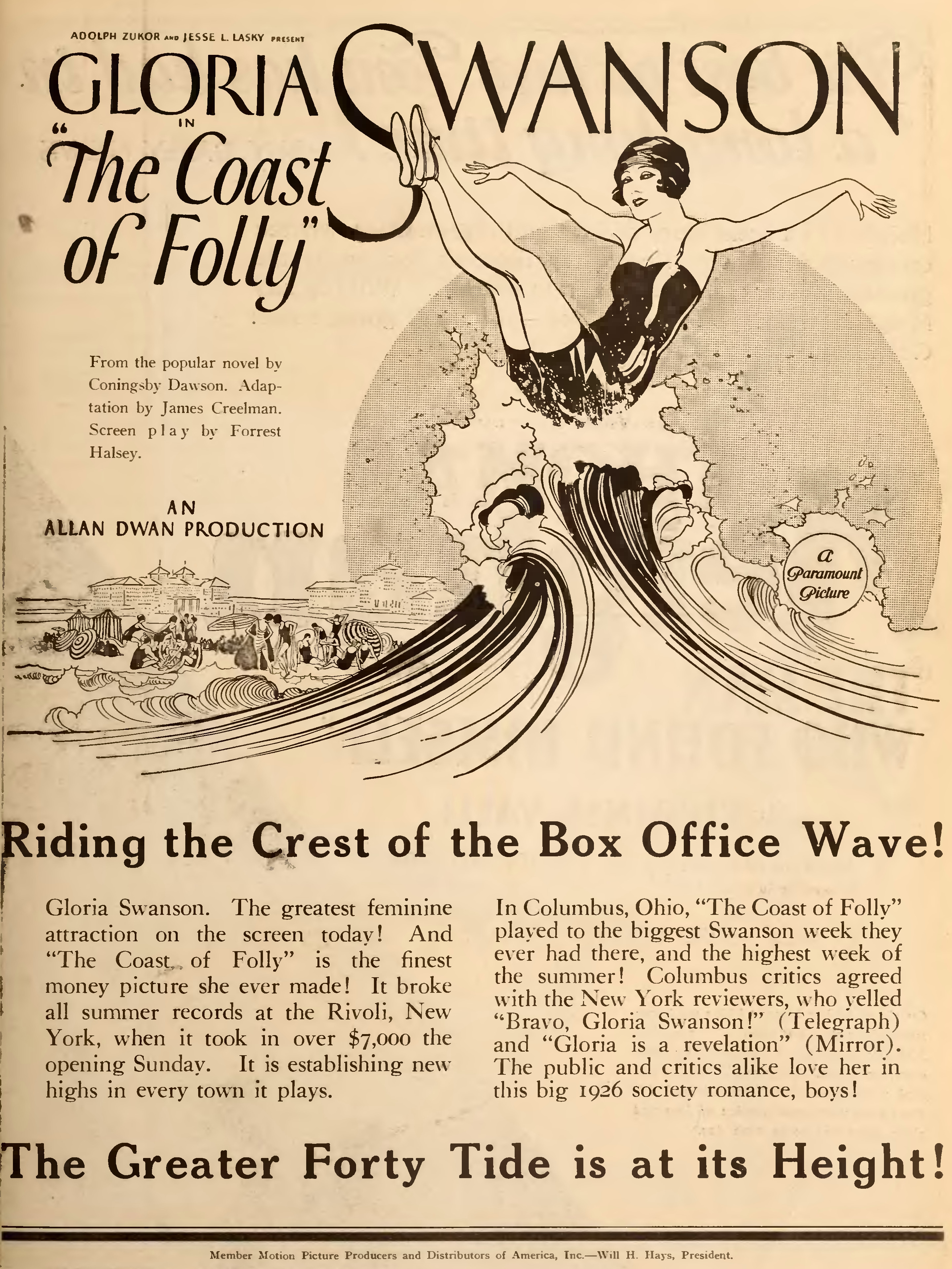
The Coast of Folly ad in Motion Picture News, 1925

The Coast of Folly is a 1925 American silent drama film directed by Allan Dwan and starring Gloria Swanson in a dual role as mother and daughter. Richard Arlen had a small part in the film but his scenes were cut before its release. The film was based on the novel of the same name by Coningsby William Dawson, and adapted for the screen by James Ashmore Creelman.

== Cast ==
- Gloria Swanson as Nadine Gathway and Joyce Gathway
- Anthony Jowitt as Larry Fay
- Alec B. Francis as Count de Tauro
- Dorothy Cumming as Constance Fay
- Jed Prouty as Cholly Knicerbocker
- Eugenie Besserer as The nanny
- Arthur Housman as The reporter
- Lawrence Gray as The bather
- Charles Clary as Unknown role
- Richard Arlen as Unknown role (scenes deleted)
- Nita Cavalier as Bathing Beauty (uncredited)

== Preservation ==
The Coast of Folly is now presumed lost though stills exist. It is one of eight films that Swanson and Dwan worked on together (four of which are now lost).
