= The Walk-Offs =

1920 lost film directed by Herbert Blaché

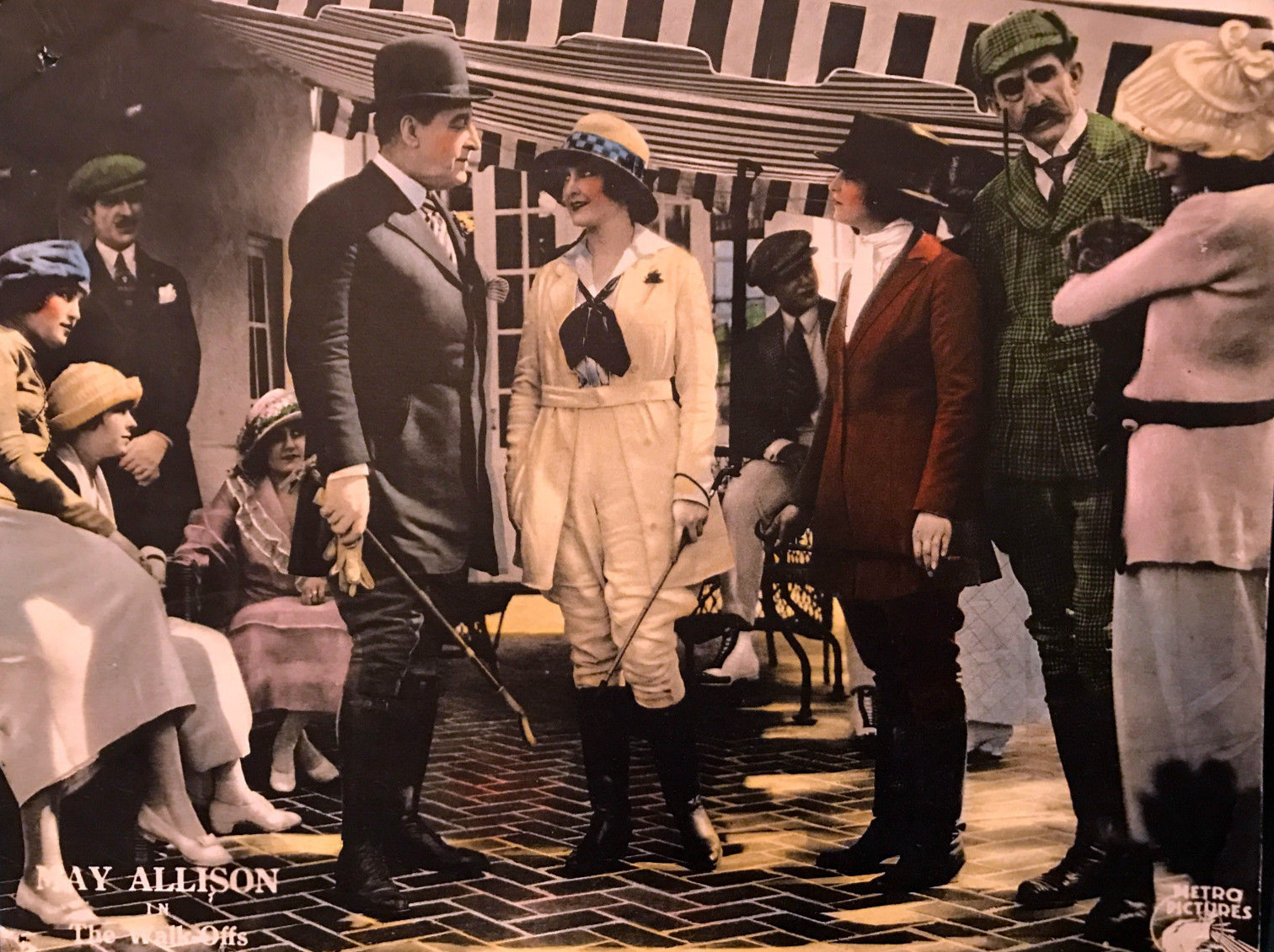
- Lobby card
- Directed by: Herbert Blaché
- Written by: June Mathis; A. P. Younger
- Based on: play by Fanny Hatton and Frederic Hatton
- Produced by: Maxwell Karger
- Starring: May Allison
- Cinematography: Arthur Martinelli
- Distributed by: Metro Pictures
- Release date: February 1920
- Running time: 6 reels
- Country: USA
- Language: Silent..English titles

The Walk-Offs is a 1920 silent film comedy directed by Herbert Blaché and starring May Allison. It was produced by Maxwell Karger and distributed through Metro Pictures. It was based on a 1918 Broadway play, The Walk-offs, by Fanny and Frederic Hatton.

== Cast ==
- May Allison as Kathleen Rutherford
- Emory Johnson as Robert Winston
- Effie Conley as Caroline Rutherford
- Darrell Foss as Schuyler Rutherford
- Joseph Kilgour as Murray Van Allan
- Richard Morris as Judge Brent
- Kathleen Kerrigan as Mary Carter
- Marie Pavis as Sonia (credited as Yvonne Pavis)
- Claire Du Brey as Mrs. Elliott
- Estelle Evans as Mrs. Asterbilt

== Preservation status ==
No prints are known to exist of this film.

== Gallery ==
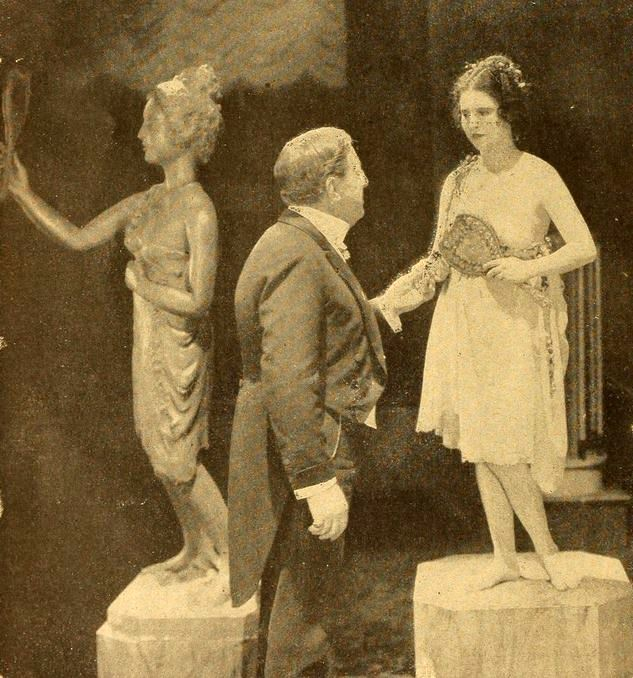

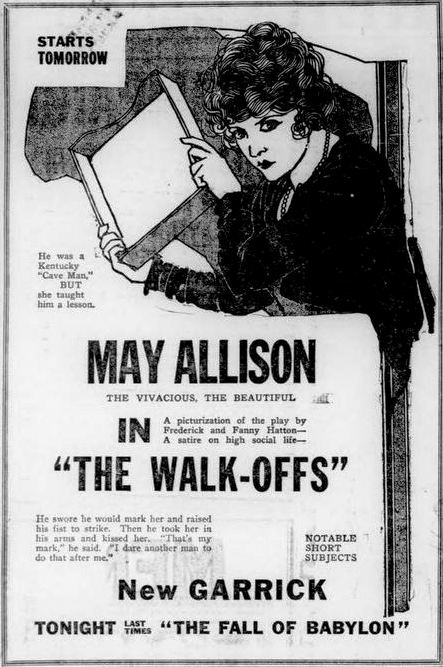

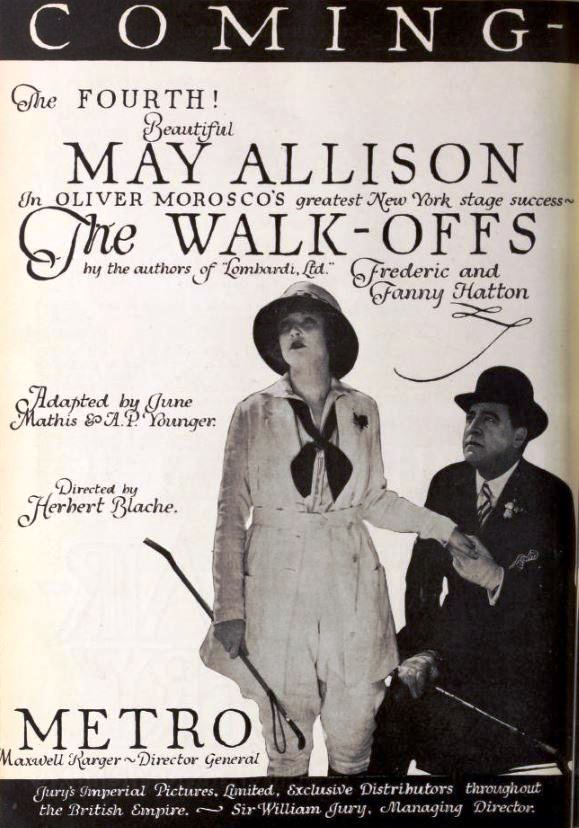

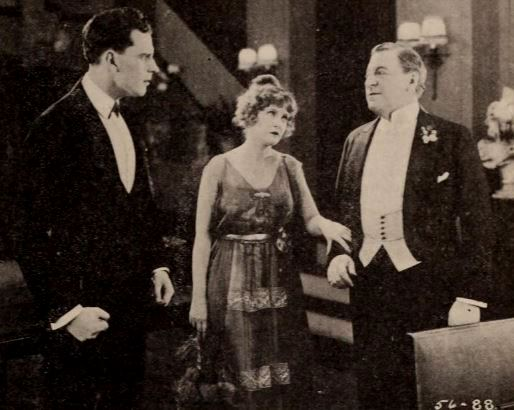

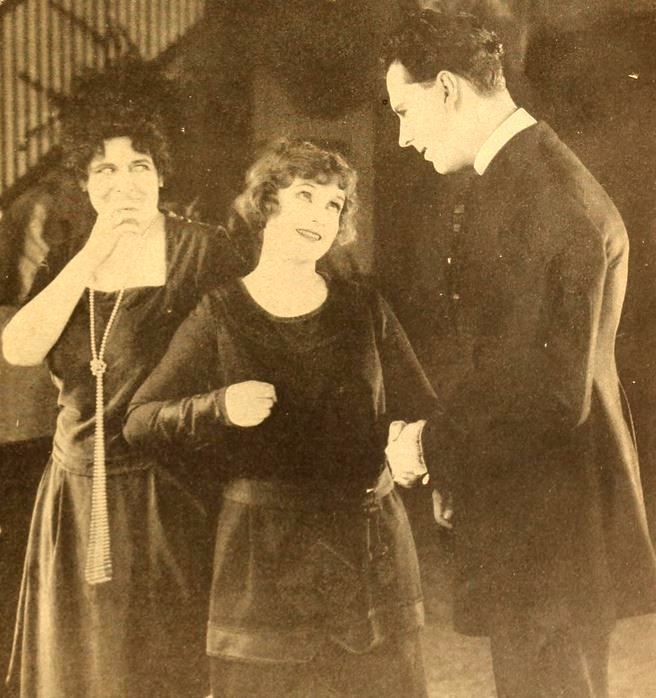

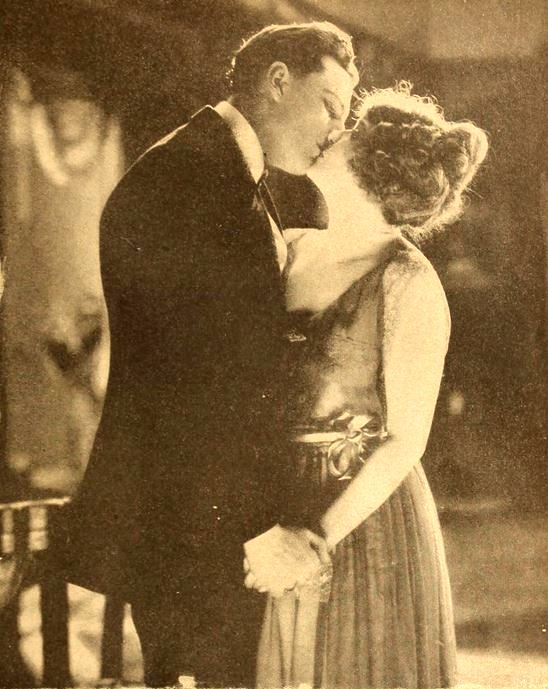

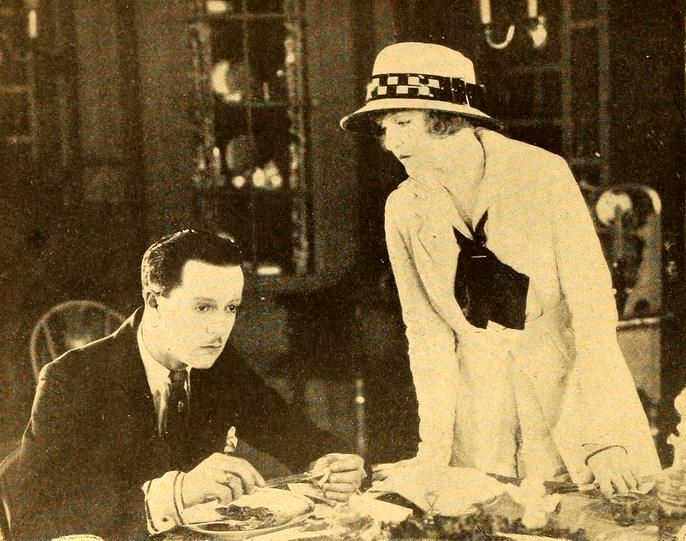
