= The Stolen Ranch =

1926 film

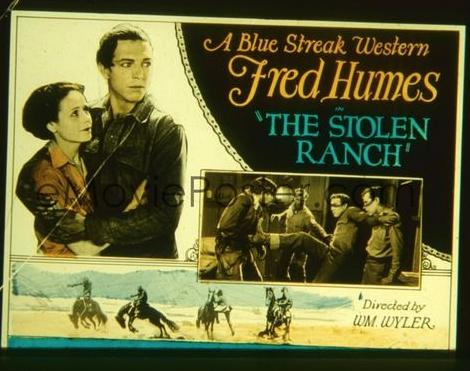
- Theatrical poster
- Directed by: William Wyler
- Written by: Robert F. Hill; George H. Plympton
- Produced by: Carl Laemmle
- Starring: Fred Humes; Louise Lorraine; William Bailey
- Cinematography: Alan Jones
- Production company: Universal Pictures
- Distributed by: Universal Pictures
- Release date: December 26, 1926
- Running time: 56 minutes
- Country: United States
- Language: Silent (English intertitles)

The Stolen Ranch is a 1926 American silent Western film directed by William Wyler and starring Fred Humes, Louise Lorraine, and William Bailey. The future star Janet Gaynor appeared as an extra in the film.

== Plot ==
As described in a film magazine, Breezy Hart takes charge of his war buddy, Frank Wilcox, who has shell shock so badly that he goes out of his head every time he hears a noise. Breezy leaves Frank in a deserted cabin near the ranch formerly owned by his dead uncle and now possessed by Sam Hardy, although Frank has good reason to believe that his uncle intended to leave the place to him. Breezy gets a job on the ranch as pot scraper and supports Frank in his hideout while Frank becomes friendly with June Marston, daughter of a neighboring rancher. Breezy at the same time has fallen in love with Mary Jane, his kitchen pal at the ranch. Hardy is alarmed when he receives word from the government that Frank Wilcox, believed dead, has been discharged from the service also suffering from shell shock. Later one of the ranch hands learns of Frank's presence in the vicinity when he fires a gun near the cabin hideout and Frank shows his fear of the noise by falling off a rock and injuring himself. The hand carries the news to Hardy at the ranch house. Hardy determines to do away with Ftank and orders two roughnecks to make for the cabin at once. Breezy, listening at the kitchen door, hears Hardy plot with a conspirator to accept Tom Marston's cash offer for the property and burn the original. He breaks in on them, knocks them both out and gets the document away from them. He jumps on his horse and rides to the cabin where he finds Frank engaged in a losing tussle with Hardy's killers. His arrival turns the tide of battle, and the two men are not only licked, but are compelled to stand at the window to await the arrival of Hardy, who enters the shack when they assure him that they have the two boys hog-tied. As soon as Hardy enters, he is promptly knocked down and locked in with the other two while the boys ride back to the ranch. Their prisoners escape and pursue the boys to the ranch house, only to be met by the grinning sheriff and his posse, who take charge of the conspirators, leaving the owner of the ranch, now cured of shell shock, to make arrangements for his partner's wedding, as well as his own.

== Cast ==
- Fred Humes as 'Breezy' Hart
- Louise Lorraine as Mary Jane
- William Bailey as Sam Hardy
- Ralph McCullough as Frank Wilcox
- Nita Cavalier as June Marston
- Edward Cecil as Lawyer James Morton
- Howard Truesdale as Tom Marston
- Slim Whitaker as Henchman Hank
- Jack Kirk as Ranch Hand Slim
- Janet Gaynor (uncredited)
- Robert Dunbar as Cowhand (uncredited)

== Production ==
Filming of The Stolen Ranch occurred in the Alabama Hills near Lone Pine, California. It was one of several films of the 1920s that expressed the disillusionment many Americans felt concerning the United States involvement in World War I and its aftermath. The Stolen Ranch was among 14 other silent films portraying the shell shocked soldier as "an honorable, heroic man temporarily disabled by war," the others being Missing (1918), Vive la France! (1918), The Trembling Hour (1919), Three Live Ghosts (1922), Shattered Dreams (1922), Shell Shocked Sammy (1923), Shootin' for Love (1923), Wandering Fires (1925), The Unknown Soldier (1926), Puppets (1926), Vanishing Hoofs (1926), Closed Gates (1927), Absent (1928), and Burning Bridges (1928).

== Preservation ==
This film exists and has been released on DVD.

== Bibliography ==
- Munden, Kenneth White. The American Film Institute Catalog of Motion Pictures Produced in the United States, Part 1. University of California Press, 1997.
