= Garments of Truth =

1921 film

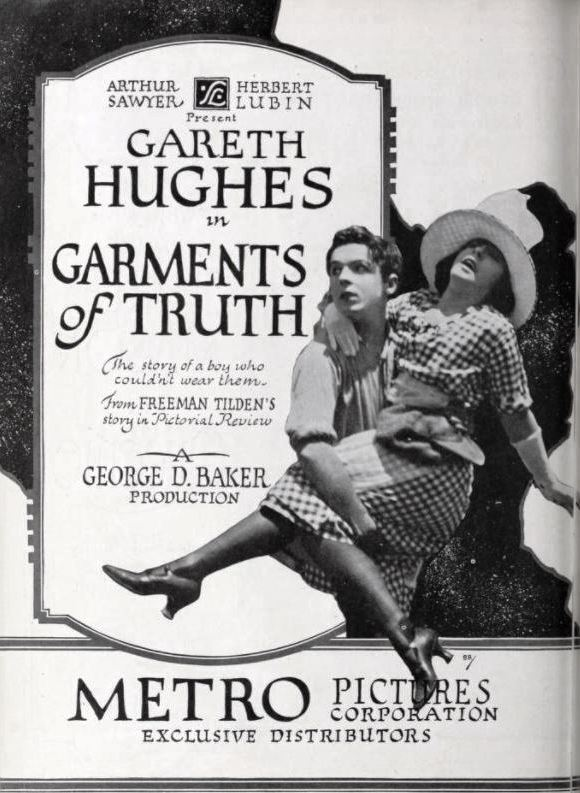
- Directed by: George D. Baker
- Written by: Freeman Tilden
- Starring: Gareth Hughes; Ethel Grandin; John Steppling
- Cinematography: Rudolph J. Bergquist
- Production company: Sawyer-Lubin Pictures Corporation
- Distributed by: Metro Pictures
- Release date: October 5, 1921
- Running time: 50 minutes
- Country: United States
- Languages: Silent; English intertitles

Garments of Truth is a 1921 American silent comedy film directed by George D. Baker and starring Gareth Hughes, Ethel Grandin and John Steppling. Though not credited, the prolific Winifred Dunn may have worked on the film's scenario.

== Cast ==
- Gareth Hughes as Lester Crope
- Ethel Grandin as Catherine Willis
- John Steppling as Deacon Ballantine
- Frances Raymond as Mrs. Ballantine
- Margaret McWade as Mrs. Crope
- Graham Pettie as Mr. Crope
- Frank Norcross as James H. Barnes
- Harry Lorraine as Alex Hawley
- Walter Perry as Nat Sears
- Herbert Fortier as Dr. G. B. Palmer
- Herbert Prior as Dr. W.H. Palmer
- Ilean Hume as Tilly Snooks
- Sylvia Ashton as Widow Jones
- Eric Mayne as Dr. Mills
- Effie Conley as Millie Thomas

== Bibliography ==
- Connelly, Robert B. The Silents: Silent Feature Films, 1910-36, Volume 40, Issue 2. December Press, 1998.
- Munden, Kenneth White. The American Film Institute Catalog of Motion Pictures Produced in the United States, Part 1. University of California Press, 1997.
