= A Favor to a Friend =

1919 film by John Ince

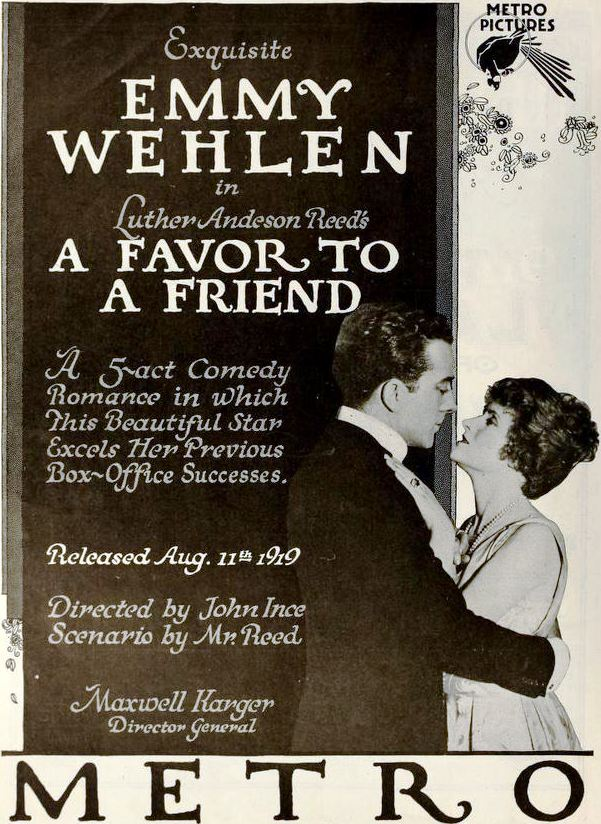
- Directed by: John Ince
- Written by: Luther Reed (story,scenario)
- Produced by: Maxwell Karger
- Starring: Emmy Wehlen
- Cinematography: Arthur Martinelli
- Distributed by: Metro Pictures
- Release date: August 18, 1919
- Country: United States
- Language: Silent..(English intertitles)

A Favor to a Friend is a lost 1919 silent film comedy produced and distributed by Metro Pictures and directed by John Ince. The film starred Emmy Wehlen.

== Cast ==
- Emmy Wehlen as May Worthington
- Jack Mulhall as Robert Garrison
- Hugh Fay as Danny Abbott
- Joseph Kilgour as Mark Arnold
- Effie Conley as Gloria Morning
- Jack Miller as Sam Arnold (*aka Rube Miller)
- Harry Todd as William Z. Williams
- Fred Warren as The Star Tenor
