= Ridin' Wild (1922 film) =

1922 film

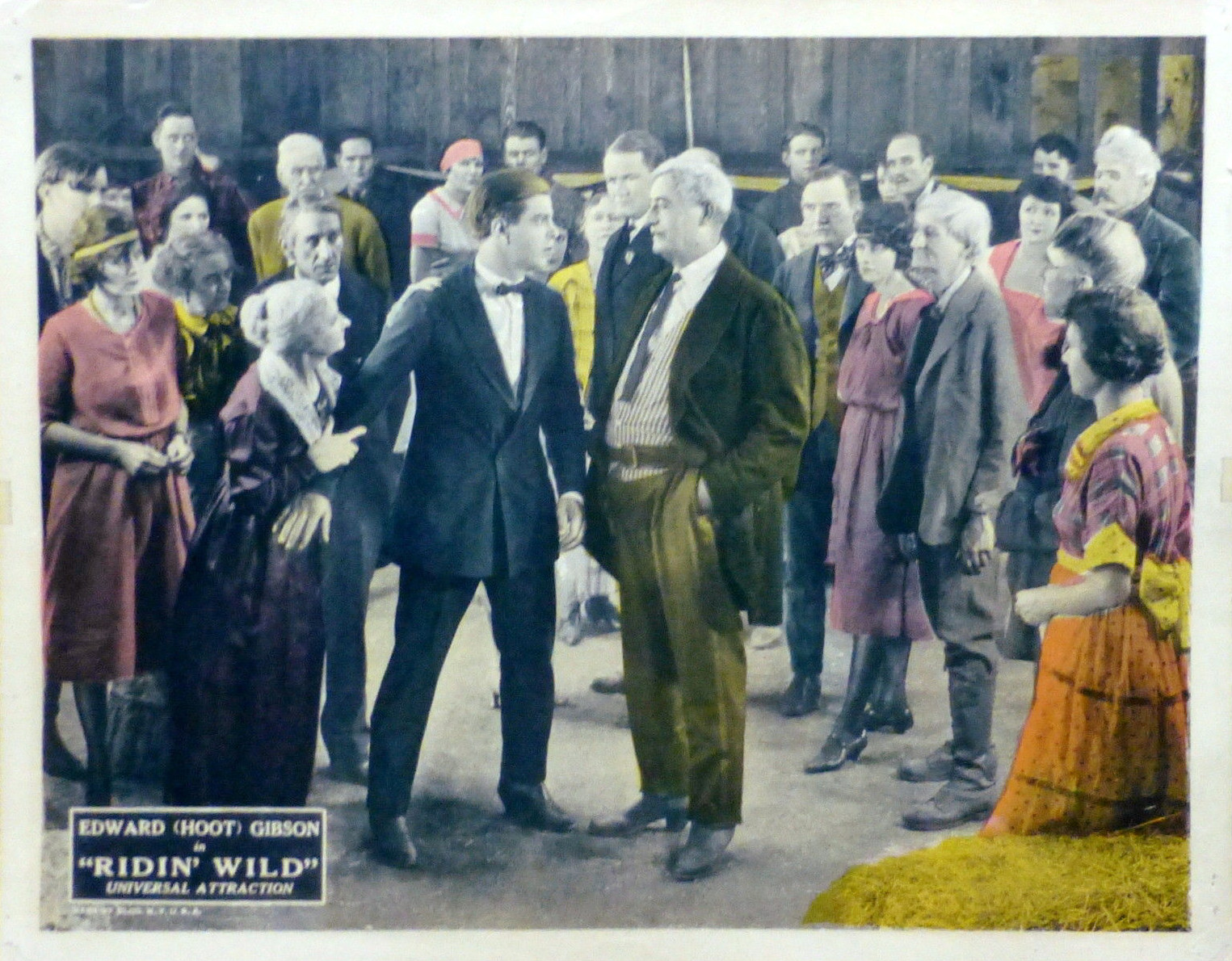
- Lobby card
- Directed by: Nat Ross
- Written by: Edward T. Lowe Jr. Ray Myers
- Starring: Hoot Gibson
- Cinematography: Virgil Miller
- Distributed by: Universal Pictures
- Release date: November 19, 1922
- Running time: 50 minutes
- Country: United States
- Languages: Silent; English intertitles

Ridin' Wild is a 1922 American silent Western film directed by Nat Ross and featuring Hoot Gibson. It is not known whether the film currently survives, suggesting that it is a lost film.

== Plot ==
Based upon a review in a film publication, Cyril Henderson (Gibson), although growing up in a western community where guns are common and liquor freely drunk, was never raised by his Quaker mother (Claire) to be "rough." Cyril's sweetheart Grace Nolan (Murphy) returns from college and, to his dismay, town bully Art Jordan (Boteler) announces that she is his "steady." Grace goes along with this to teach Cyril a lesson. When Cyril then tries to get rough to please her, the people in the town laugh at him. Old Andrew McBride (Hoffman), who held mortgages on nearly everyone in town, is found murdered, and Cyril's father (Welsh) is arrested as the suspect since he was the last person to see McBride. Cyril tries to confess to the crime to free his father, but Sheriff Nolen, who is Grace's father, says "Cyril, you can't do it!" Art tries to get the townspeople to lynch John, but Cyril to the surprise of everyone knocks him down. After Cyril learns of further plans to lynch his father, he grabs a gun and covers the Sheriff and some townspeople, and then grabs Grace and rides off with her. The Sheriff and the townspeople ride after him. The issue of the identity of the murderer and Cyril's courage are settled in the desert.

== Cast ==
- Hoot Gibson as Cyril Henderson (credited as Edward "Hoot" Gibson)
- Edna Murphy as Grace Nolan
- Wade Boteler as Art Jordan
- Jack Walker as George Berge
- Otto Hoffman as Andrew McBride
- Wilton Taylor as Sheriff Nolan
- Bert Wilson as Alfred Clark
- Gertrude Claire as Mrs. Henderson
- William Welsh as John Henderson
