= Winnie Baldwin =

American dramatist (1894–1969)

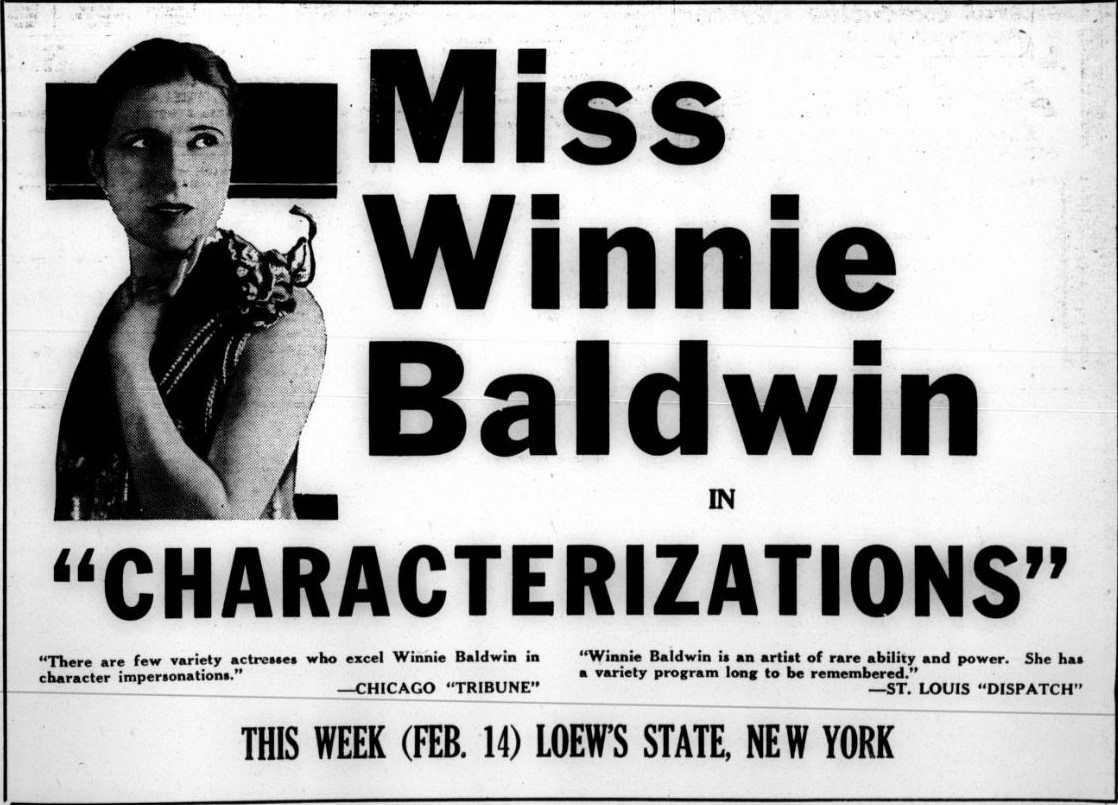
- 1927 Variety advertisement
- Born: April 7, 1894; Kentucky, U.S.
- Died: October 7, 1969 (aged 75); San Bernardino County, California, U.S.
- Occupations: Actress, vaudevillian, writer

Winnie Baldwin (April 7, 1894 – October 7, 1969) was an American vaudevillian, film actress, and playwright.

== Early life and career ==
Baldwin was born in Kentucky on April 7, 1894.

In 1913, Baldwin was described as having "a sort of Howard Chandler Christy girl plus vaudeville sprightliness, the delightful American type we all fall for every time."

Baldwin and her first husband Percy Bronson performed together in an act known as "Bronson and Baldwin." They performed together in the play So Long Letty at the Shubert Theatre, singing "Pass around the Apples Once Again."

Baldwin performed in Mercenary Mary at the Longacre Theatre in 1925. Don Carle Gillette wrote that Baldwin "helps the comedy along and puts over a couple of song numbers well."

She later partnered with Joe Morris; their act was called Morris and Baldwin.

Baldwin performed at Loew's American Theatre in 1928. A review in The Billboard said, "Her easy, winning manner suggests that Miss Baldwin with a newly written act would go over big. She is capable of rising to the summit, but never quite reaches the heights."

Baldwin wrote two plays, including House of Mander, also referred to as Mander's Sons, which played at the Apollo in Atlantic City, New Jersey, in October 1929. A review read, "Despite its faults, the play has some dramatic force, and with the lustful emotions of its chief character, may have a chance, providing it gets by New York's equivalent to 'the watch and ward' society." It was staged by Lawrence Marston.

Her comedy Divided Honors played Belmont, New York. Some of her vaudeville gags were employed in the show. It was reviewed in Variety: "In vaude you've got to give it to them snappy. Maybe that's why Miss Baldwin was at her best in the first act." The Morning News of Wilmington, Delaware, wrote, "The play has all the fluva of a very palpable hit".

== Personal life and death ==
In 1914, she married performer Percy V. Raisbeck, known professionally as Percy Bronson, with whom she had three children: Edna, Douglas, and Hazel. She and Raisbeck divorced in 1923; Baldwin retained custody of the children. After Raisbeck died in 1927, Baldwin was named "administratrix" of his estate.

Baldwin married William Franks in 1935.

Baldwin died on October 7, 1969, in San Bernardino County, California.

== Theatre credits ==
- So Long Letty (October 23, 1916 – January 13, 1917) as Sadie McQuiggle
- Mercenary Mary (April 13, 1925 – August 8, 1925) as Mary Skinner
- Divided Honors (September 30, 1929 – November 1929) – writer
- House of Mander (October 1929) – writer

== Filmography ==
- In the Ranks (1913) (short) as Hazel Story, the Colonel's daughter
- The Great Sacrifice (1913) (short) as Helen
- For the Cause (1912) (short) as Helen
- The Lieutenant's Last Fight (1912) (short)
- The Deserter (1912) (short)
