= Weary Willie's Rags =

1914 film

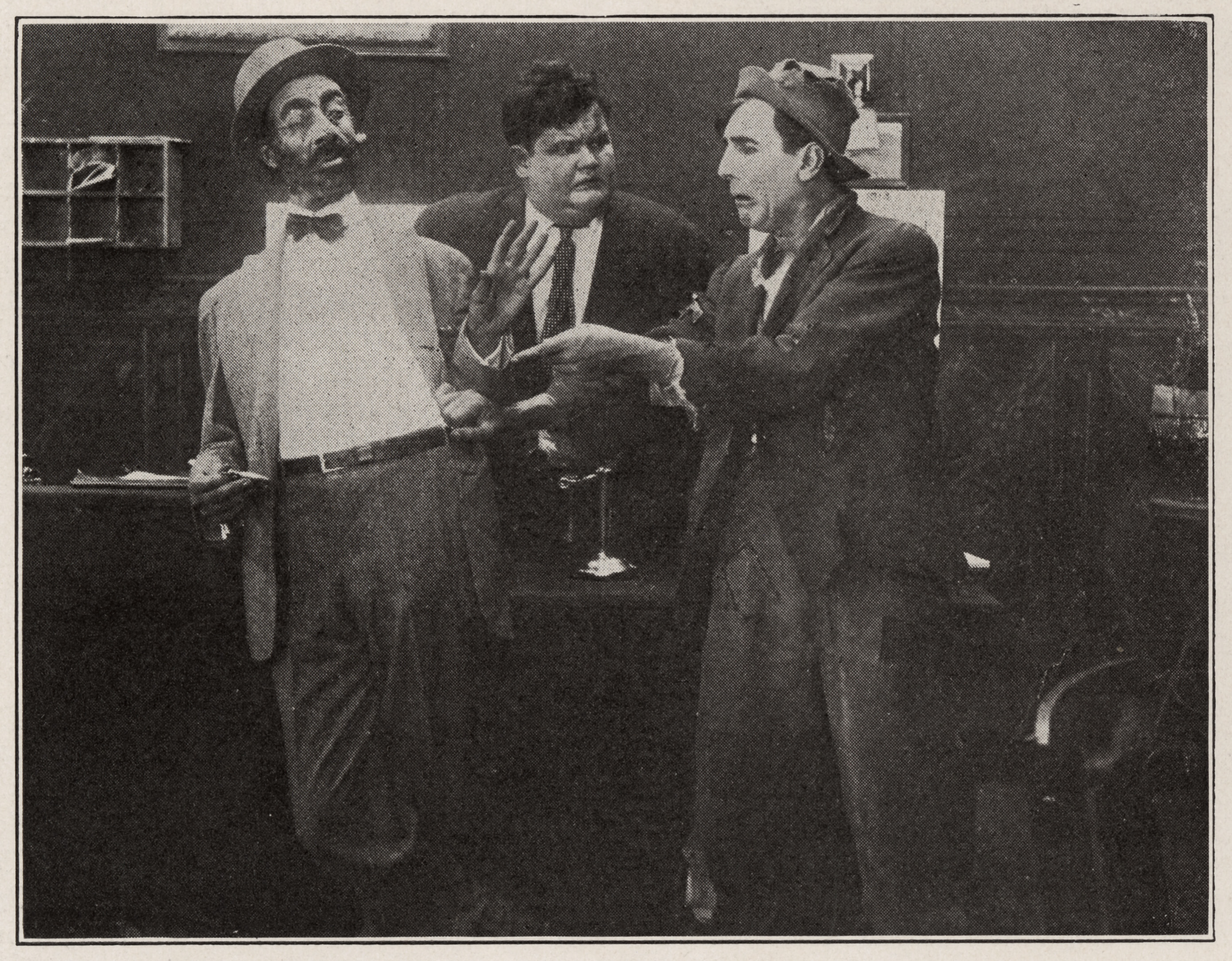
- Ben Walker, "Babe" Hardy, and Harry Lorraine in a publicity still from Weary Willie's Rags
- Written by: John A. Murphy
- Produced by: Arthur Hotaling
- Starring: Harry Lorraine; Ben Walker; Oliver Hardy
- Release date: December 15, 1914
- Running time: ca. 8 minutes (600 feet)
- Country: United States
- Languages: Silent film English intertitles

Weary Willie's Rags is a 1914 American split-reel silent comedy film produced by the Lubin Manufacturing Company and featuring Harry Lorraine, Ben Walker, and Oliver Hardy.

== Plot ==
This plot summary was published in the Lubin Bulletin in December 1914, and also appeared in the copyright application for the film, now in the Library of Congress:

Henry Paff, a business man in a small town, makes a trip to the city. He arrives late, puts up at a hotel and sleeps soundly. So does the hotel clerk, for during the night William Ragson, a tramp, sneaks into Paff's room and exchanges his old rags for Paff's neat attire. In the morning Paff tries to telephone the office without success and is finally obliged to put on the tramp's filthy rags which changes his appearance so greatly that when he complains to the clerk he gets no satisfaction and is kicked out by the porter. In the meantime, Ragson dressed in Paff's clothes and in possession of his money and papers, lives on the fat of the land and when he meets Paff on the street he kicks him out of the way. Paff, unable to identify himself, or get any redress, gets desperately hungry and appropriates a lunch basket he finds in the park. He is promptly arrested and when taken to the station is surprised to meet Ragson who has been arrested for riotous behavior. The hotel keeper is summoned, Paff is identified and Ragson meets the fate of all transgressors.

== Cast ==
- Harry Lorraine as Henry Paff
- Ben Walker as William Ragson
- Oliver Hardy as the hotel clerk

== Production and reception ==
Weary Willie's Rages was written John A. Murphy and produced by Arthur Hotaling, the general supervisor of the Jacksonville, Florida unit of the Lubin Manufacturing Company of Philadelphia. It was a short split-reel comedy, lasting approximately eight minutes and sharing a single reel of film with It Cured Hubby, an unrelated comedy written by William B. Courtny and featuring Mabel Paige, C. W. Ritchie, James Levering, and Eva Bell. The films were released by the General Film Company on December 15, 1914, and are among a group of short comedies made by the Lubin company in 1914 and early 1915 that include the earliest screen appearances of Oliver Hardy. Hardy can be seen in a still reproduced in the Lubin studio's promotional bulletin, although his name does not appear in the cast list.

Reviews of the film in the trade papers emphasized the familiarity of the plot. Motion Picture News described it as "a split reel comedy based on the familiar situation of a tramp changing clothes with a prosperous citizen", with no other comment. The New York Dramatic Mirror wrote: "J. A. Murphy, author of this farce, has used a favorite situation in which a tramp steals the clothes of a prosperous man and then impersonates the owner of the garments, while the victim is forced to appear as a tramp. The idea could hardly be expected to inspire anything very novel in the way of comedy action, but Harry Lorraine and Ben Walker do their best to be funny."

== See also ==
- List of American films of 1914
- Filmography of Oliver Hardy
