= William Eagle Shirt =

American actor

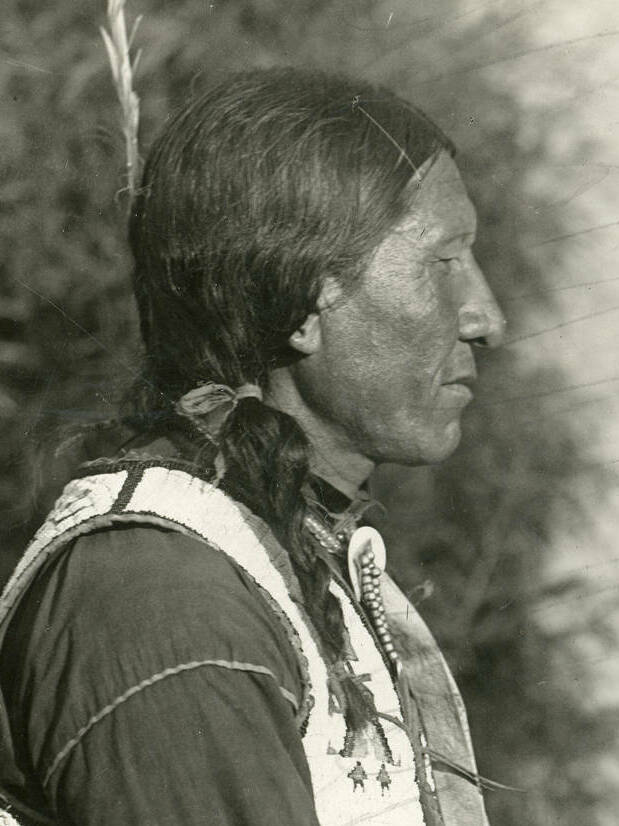
- Born: William Eagle Shirt; 1873; South Dakota, USA
- Died: 1967; Texas
- Other names: Good Lance
- Occupation(s): Actor, screenwriter

William "Good Lance" Eagle Shirt was a Native American actor, performer, and screenwriter who was born and raised on the Great Plains of South Dakota. He appeared in a string of Hollywood films in the 1910s and is credited with co-writing two of them.

== Biography ==
William and his family — all Oglala Sioux — were forced to settle on the Pine Ridge Reservation, where he met and married a woman named Mattie; the pair had a daughter named Bessie. After performing in Wild West shows, he began appearing in silent films. At some point, he remarried a woman named Emma; the pair divorced in 1942 with no children.

== Selected filmography ==
- The Conqueror (1917)
- The Silent Lie (1917)
- The Last Ghost Dance (1914)
- The Arrow Maker's Daughter (1914)
- His Squaw (1912)
- The Invaders (1912)
- Custer's Last Fight (1912)
- The Outcast (1912)
- The Lieutenant's Last Fight (1912)
- The Battle of the Red Men (1912) (also writer)
- The Heart of an Indian (1912)
- War on the Plains (1912) (also writer)
