= Ray Myers =

American actor

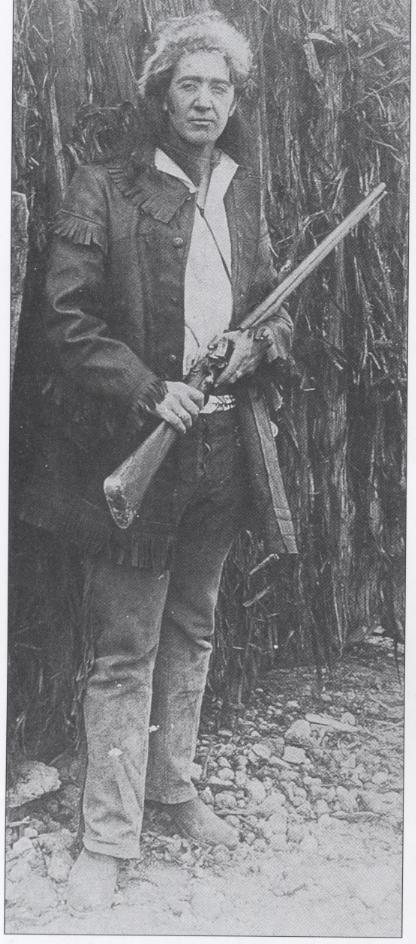
- Myers as Davy Crockett in The Siege and Fall of the Alamo (1914)
- Born: June 21, 1889; Hot Springs, Arkansas, US
- Died: November 4, 1956 (aged 67); Los Angeles, California, US
- Occupations: Actor; Film director
- Years active: 1910-1924

Ray Myers (June 21, 1889 – November 4, 1956) was an American film actor and director of the silent film era. He appeared in 43 films between 1912 and 1924. He also directed five films between 1910 and 1915, including The Siege and Fall of the Alamo (1914), now considered a lost film. Only a few still photographs remain at the Library of Congress. He was born in Hot Springs, Arkansas and died in Los Angeles, California.

== Selected filmography ==
- War on the Plains (1912)
- The Invaders (1912)
- The Battle of Bull Run (1913)
- Buckshot John (1915)
- Ridin' Wild (1922)
- Her Dangerous Path (1923)
- The Hunchback of Notre Dame (1923)
- Leatherstocking (1924)
