= Behind the Times (film) =

1911 film by Thomas H. Ince

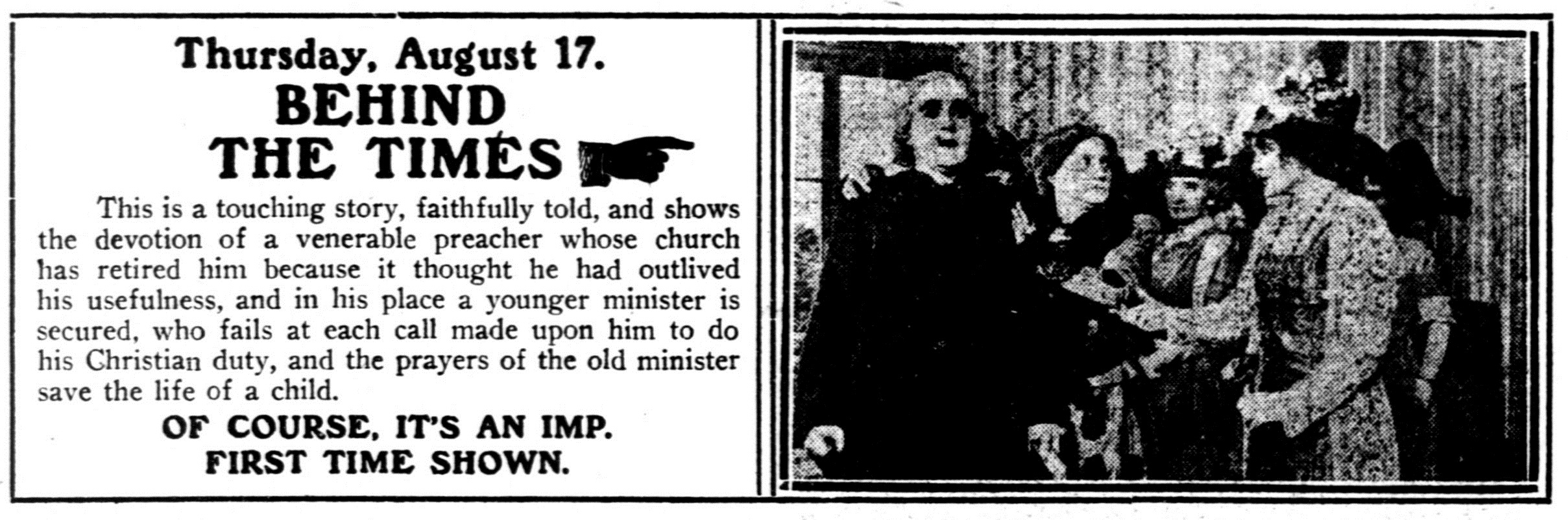
A newspaper advertisement.

Behind the Times is a 1911 short film by Thomas H. Ince with Owen Moore, Ethel Grandin, and Lucille Young. According to a contemporary newspaper, the story is about the conflict between an old priest who is asked to retire and a young priest who can't do the job properly.
