= War on the Plains =

1912 film

War on the Plains (aka Across the Plains)
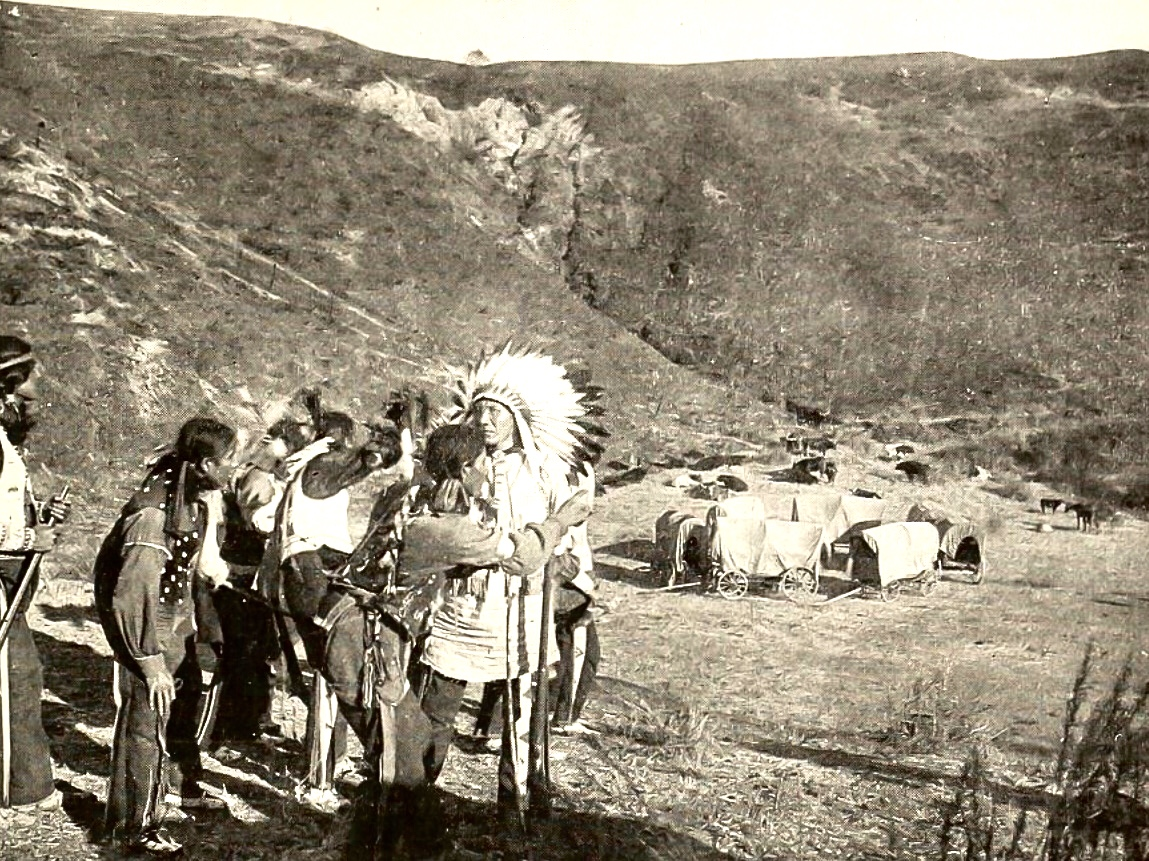
- Film still, 1912
- Directed by: Thomas H. Ince
- Written by: William Eagle Shirt; Thomas H. Ince; Ray Myers
- Produced by: Bison Motion Pictures, New York Motion Picture Company
- Starring: Francis Ford; Ethel Grandin
- Distributed by: Motion Picture Distributors and Sales Company; Cosmopolitan Films (UK)
- Release date: February 23, 1912
- Running time: 2 reels (20 minutes)
- Country: United States
- Languages: Silent; English intertitles

War on the Plains, also called Across the Plains, is a 1912 American short silent Western film directed by Thomas H. Ince and starring Francis Ford, Ethel Grandin and Ray Myers. It was produced by Bison Motion Pictures, a subsidiary of the New York Motion Picture Company. The film was made at Inceville, Santa Ynez, California.

This short is referred to as Across the Plains in Daniel Blum's Pictorial History of Silent Films. Several other films with this title were released before and after this short was initially distributed.

== Cast ==
- Francis Ford as Drake, a Treacherous Prospector
- Ethel Grandin as Ethel, the Wagon Captain's Daughter
- Ray Myers as A Young Emigrant
- Howard Davies as A Prospector
- William Eagle Shirt as Indian
- J. Barney Sherry as Frontiersman
- Art Acord as Frontiersman
- Clayton Monroe Teters as Indian (unbilled)

== Preservation status ==
This film is preserved in the UCLA Film & TV archive.
