= Just Jim (1915 film) =

1915 film

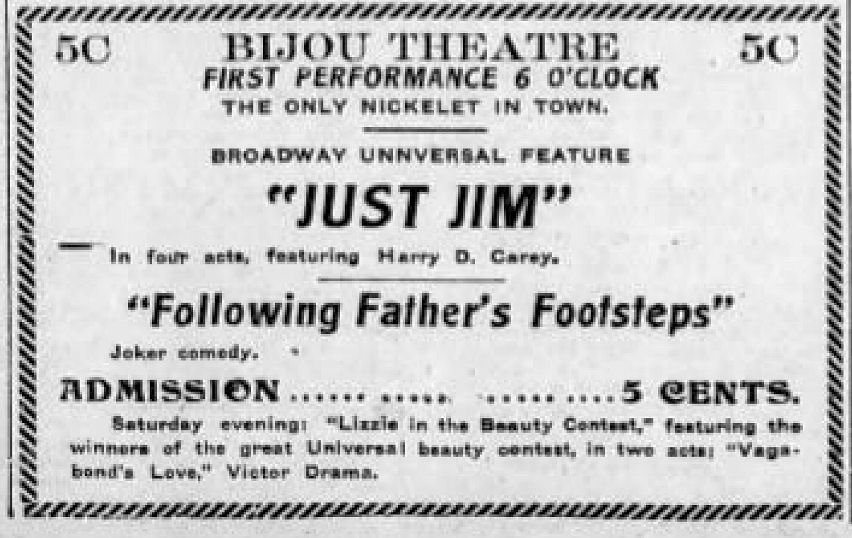
- Newspaper advertisement
- Directed by: O.A.C. Lund
- Written by: O.A.C. Lund
- Starring: Harry Carey
- Distributed by: Universal Pictures
- Release date: August 16, 1915
- Running time: 4 reels
- Country: United States
- Language: Silent (English intertitles)

Just Jim is a 1915 American silent drama film directed by O.A.C. Lund and featuring Harry Carey. It was released by Universal Pictures.

== Cast ==
- Harry Carey as Jim (credited as Harry D. Carey)
- Jean Taylor as Rose
- William A. Crinley as Undetermined Role (credited as William Crinley)
- Albert Edmondson as Undetermined Role (credited as Mr. Edmundson)
- Duke Worne as Undetermined Role
- Olive Carey as Undetermined Role (credited as Olive Golden)
- Jack Abbott (credited as J.F. Abbott)
- Harry Lorraine (credited as Mr. Lorraine)
