= Custer's Last Fight =

1912 film

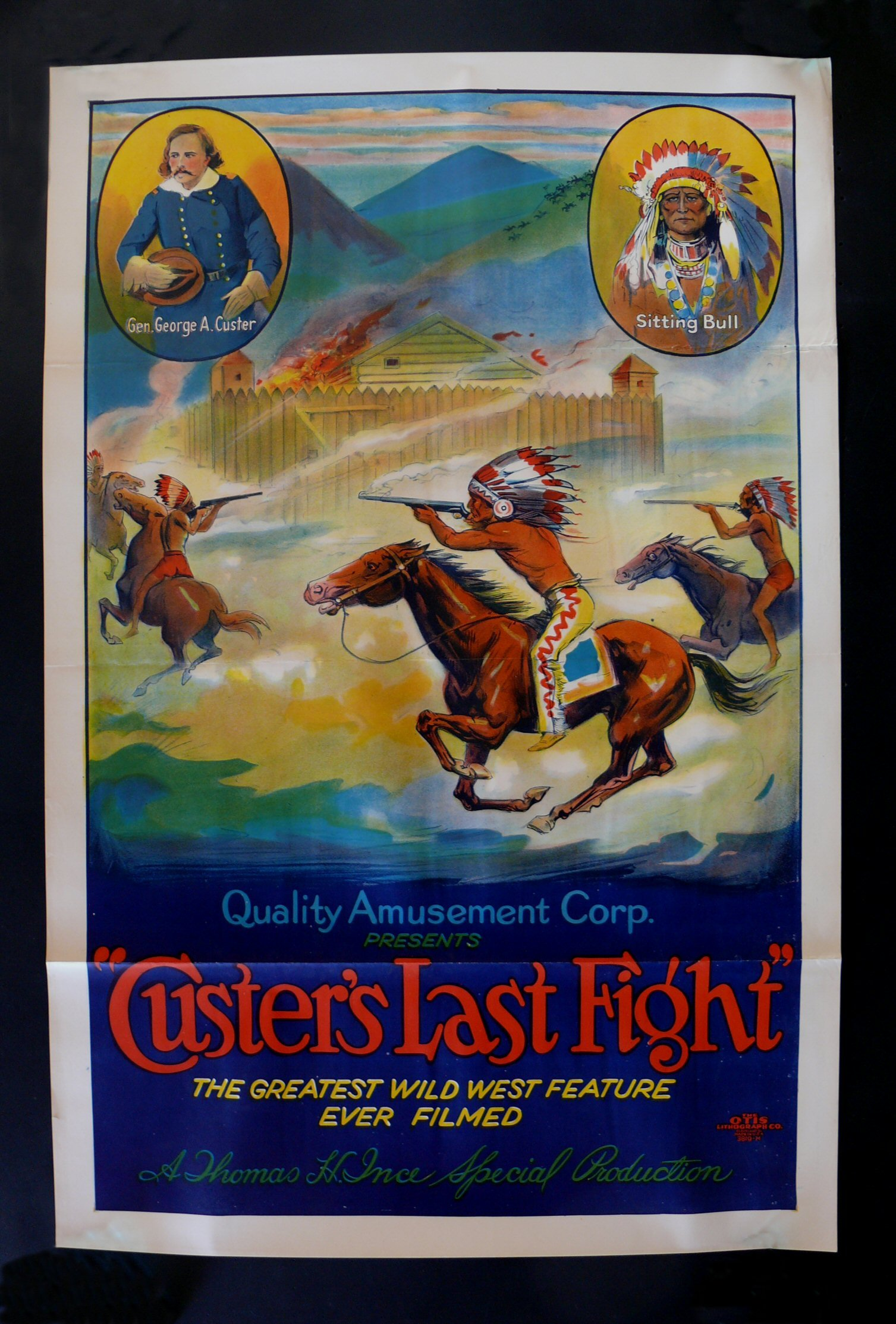
- 1925 re-release poster
- Directed by: Francis Ford
- Written by: Richard V. Spencer
- Produced by: Thomas H. Ince
- Starring: Francis Ford; Grace Cunard
- Cinematography: Ray Smallwood
- Distributed by: Mutual Film
- Release date: October 4, 1912 (United States)
- Running time: 2 reels (approximately 30 minutes)
- Country: United States
- Languages: Silent; English intertitles

Custer's Last Fight (also known as Custer's Last Raid) is a 1912 American silent Western short film. It is the first film about George Armstrong Custer and his final stand at the Battle of the Little Bighorn. Francis Ford, the older brother of director John Ford, directed the two-reel short and also starred in the title role. It was shot principally in "Inceville" at Santa Ynez Canyon in Pacific Palisades, California.

The film was re-released in 1925 and 1933.

== Cast ==
- Francis Ford as George Armstrong Custer
- Grace Cunard as Mrs. Custer
- William Eagle Shirt as Sitting Bull
- J. Barney Sherry as James McLaughlin
- Art Acord as a Trooper
- Ann Little
- Lillian Christy
- Charles K. French
- Snowball as a horse
