= Producers Library Service =

Stock footage library

- Company type: Private company
- Industry: Stock footage, stock photography, post-production
- Founded: 1957
- Headquarters: North Hollywood, California, USA
- Number of employees: 2–10
- Website: www.ProducersLibrary.com

Producers Library Service is a provider of stock footage and photographs for professional film and TV productions.

Producers Library is "The longest-established stock film footage company in the US". Since it was founded in 1957 the company has built up a collection of 16mm and 35mm film, high definition video footage, and photos, consisting of locations shots from around the world, outtakes from feature films and TV, newsreels, classic film trailers, and more. Their film archive has a special focus in entertainment history including "Hollywood history from 1910, specializing in the golden age of Hollywood."

The size of the library has grown over the years and now includes "over ten million feet of 35mm and 16mm film and approximately thirty thousand hours of video."

== History ==
Producers Library was founded in 1957, when the "librarians at —RKO and MGM—decided to form their own company".

The archival footage from Producers Library has been used in major Hollywood feature films such as the intro to L.A. Confidential, where their stock footage shots of Los Angeles in the 1950s transport the viewer to the time period in which the film takes place. They provided vintage stock footage shots for the HBO film Hemingway & Gellhorn, which the filmmakers used to place actors Clive Owen and Nicole Kidman in with the help of a green screen. Producers Library has also provided stock footage and still photos to other television and film productions such as documentaries on historical figures Marlon Brando, Bob Marley, Howard Hughes, and Greta Garbo.
