= Collinson =

Collinson is a surname. Notable people with the surname include:

- Angel Collinson (born 1990), American skier
- Arthur Collinson (1929–1987), Australian rugby player
- Charles Streynsham Collinson (1753–1831), English colonial administrator
- Cliff Collinson (1920–1990), English footballer
- Dick Collinson (1923–2013), Australian footballer
- Edward Collinson (1801–1861), Australian businessman and politician
- Edward Collinson (cricketer) (1849–1920), New Zealand cricketer
- Frank Collinson (died 1811), English jockey
- Fred Collinson (1874–1915), English footballer and soldier
- Geoff Collinson, Australian horn player
- Harry Collinson Owen (1882–1956), British journalist and author
- James Collinson (1825–1881), English artist
- Jimmy Collinson (1876–1940), English footballer
- John Collinson (cricketer) (1911–1979), English cricketer
- John Collinson (historian) (1757–1793), English cleric and historian
- Laurence Collinson (1925–1986), British and Australian playwright, actor and poet
- Leopold Henry Collinson (1878–1954), New Zealand businessman, racehorse breeder and trainer
- Les Collinson (born 1935), English footballer
- Lucy Collinson, English scientist
- Madeleine Collinson (1952–2014), Maltese-British model and actress; twin of Mary
- Margaret Collinson, British paleobotanist
- Maria Zeneida Collinson, Filipino diplomat
- Mary Collinson (1952–2021), Maltese model and actress; twin of Madeleine
- Patrick Collinson (1929–2011), English historian
- Peter Collinson (botanist) (1694–1768), English gardener, botanist and horticulturist
- Peter Collinson (film director) (1936–1980), British film director
- Phil Collinson (born 1970), British television producer
- Richard Collinson (1811–1883), English naval officer and explorer of the Arctic
- Robert Collinson (1875–1963), English cricketer
- Septimus Collinson (1739–1827), provost of Queen's College, Oxford
- Ted Collinson (1907–1982), Australian footballer
- Thomas Bernard Collinson (1821–1902), English military engineer
- Travis Collinson, American artist
- William Edward Collinson (1889–1969), British linguist
- William Robert Collinson (1912–1995), American judge

== See also ==
- Cape Collinson, also Hak Kok Tau (黑角頭), cape located near Ngan Wan between Siu Sai Wan and Big Wave Bay in the east most point of the Hong Kong Island in Hong Kong
- Collinson Peninsula, Nunavut, Canada
- Collinson Ridge, Antarctica
- Fort Collinson, Northwest Territories, Canada
- Collinson Point Provincial Park, on Galiano Island, British Columbia, Canada
