= Collis =

Collis may refer to:

== People ==
- Collis (surname)
- Collis (given name)

== Other uses ==
- Collis (planetary geology), a term used in planetary geology for a small hill or knob
- Collis, Minnesota, an unincorporated community, United States
- Collis, former name of Kerman, California, United States
- Collis, a genus of Asian funnel weavers
- Collis, a genus of trilobites

== See also ==
- Collis Mill, Great Thurlow, Suffolk, England, a Grade II* listed smock mill
