= Collis (surname) =

Collis is a surname.

== People with the surname ==
- Charles Collis (1838–1902), Irish-American US Army officer in the American Civil War
- Dean Collis (born 1985), Australian rugby player
- Gerry Collis (1930–2024), American football and baseball player and coach
- Gordon Collis (born 1940), Australian rules footballer
- Jack T. Collis (1923–1998), American art director
- James Collis (1856–1918), English soldier
- John Collis (born 1944), British prehistorian
- John Day Collis (1816–1879), British headmaster and educational writer
- John Stewart Collis (1900–1984), British author
- Luke Collis (born 1988), American football player
- Maurice Collis (1889–1973), British colonial administrator and writer
- Robert Collis (1900–1975), Irish doctor and writer
- Simon Collis (born 1956), British ambassador
- Steve Collis (born 1981), English football goalkeeper
- Susan Collis (born 1956), British artist
- Vincent Collis, American politician

== See also ==
- Coll (surname)
- Collins (surname)
- Collier (surname)
- Collings (surname)
- Collison (surname)
