= William Collis =

Irish rugby union player

- Full name: William Stewart Collis
- Born: 27 September 1860 Dublin, Ireland
- Died: 2 January 1947 (aged 86) Killiney, Dublin Ireland
- Notable relative(s): John Collis (son); Maurice Collis (son); Robert Collis (son)
- Occupation: Solicitor

Rugby union career
- Position: Forward
International career
Years	Team	Apps	(Points)
1884	Ireland	1	(0)

William Stewart Collis (27 September 1860 — 2 January 1947) was an Irish international rugby union player.

A Dublin solicitor, Collis played rugby during his youth and received an Ireland cap in 1884, playing as a forward against Wales at Cardiff. He was the head of Collis & Ward Solicitors.

Collis's son Robert was also an Ireland rugby international. Robert's twin brother was the writer John Stewart Collis and another son, Maurice Collis, was a colonial administrator in Burma.

== See also ==
- List of Ireland national rugby union players
