= Brown Brothers =

Brown Brothers may refer to:

- Brown Bros. & Co. a bank, later merging to become Brown Brothers Harriman & Co.
- Brown Brothers Harriman & Co., the oldest and largest private bank in the United States
- Brown Brothers Milawa Vineyard, an Australian wine company
- Brown Brothers Tobacco Company, a 19th-century Detroit cigar manufacturing business
- Brown Brothers, a Scottish engineering company incorporated into Vickers plc
- Brown Brothers of Great Eastern Street, London, UK, manufacturer of the Brown quadricycle first sold in 1899
- Six Brown Brothers, a jazz sextet
