= Collison =

Collison may refer to:

- Collison (surname), includes Collision
- Collison, Illinois, U.S., unincorporated community

== See also ==
- Collison House (disambiguation)
- Collision (disambiguation)
- Colliston, hamlet in Angus, Scotland
- Cullison (disambiguation)
