= Julia Calhoun =

American actress

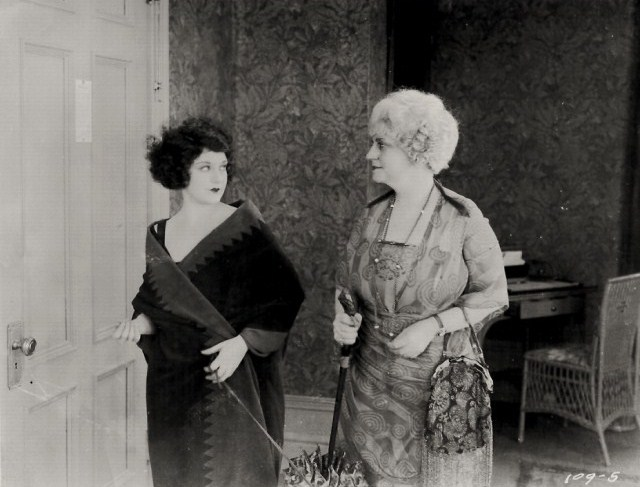
Film still of Calhoun (right) with Viola Dana in The Match-Breaker (1921)

Julia Calhoun (born 1870) was an American actress during the silent film era. She appeared on stage and in comedy films including early ones with Oliver Hardy from at least 1914 on into the 1920s.

Calhoun was born February 1870 in Philadelphia.

She was one of the performers featured in a series of cabinet cards published by Newsboy Tobacco Company for advertising purposes. The New York Public Library has a photograph of her in its Billy Rose Theatre Collection.

She was part of C. C. Field Film Company's Miami, Florida studio cast.

She was married to fellow performer Kirkland Calhoun. His death made her a widow by 1914.

== Filmography ==
- The Señorita's Repentance (1913), a Selig film
- Doing Like Daisy, a Lubin picture
- Building a Fire (1914)
- His Sudden Recovery (1914)
- A Tango Tragedy (1914)
- Good Cider (1914)
- The Female Cop (1914)
- His Sudden Recovery (1914)
- Worms Will Turn (1914)
- The Man Who Stayed at Home (1919)
- The Match-Breaker (1921)
- Just Like a Woman (1923)
