= Kyaw Yin =

Burmese balloonist

Kyaw Yin (Burmese: ကျော်ရင် 1873 - 1939), also known as Mee-Bone-Pyan U Kyaw Yin, was a Burmese balloonist who flew a hot air balloon to many places in Burma. He flew his personally designed hot air balloon (Mee-Bone-Pyan in Burmese) in acrobatic fashion as a stuntman. He tried extensively to get a license from the British Government for flying hot air balloons (at that time, Burma was under British colonial rule).

When he started performing, he was a school teacher in Tavoy High School. From the age of 56 to 66 years, he flew 55 times with his balloon that was 45 feet in height and could fly up to 2 miles in normal weather. Most of his flight income was donated to charity. He tried for a worldwide show but failed due to the difficulty acquiring a license. His last performance was in 1939 in Tavoy; he died later that year.

He is mentioned, along with a photo, in Into Hidden Burma by Maurice Collis.
