= Cullison =

Cullison may refer to:

- Cullison, Kansas, U.S., city
- Cullison (surname)

== See also ==
- Collison (disambiguation)
