= Erigomicronus =

Scientific classification
- Kingdom: Animalia
- Phylum: Arthropoda
- Subphylum: Chelicerata
- Class: Arachnida
- Order: Araneae
- Infraorder: Araneomorphae
- Family: Linyphiidae
- Genus: Erigomicronus; Tanasevitch, 2018

Type species
- Oreonetides longembolus (Wunderlich & Li, 1995)

Species
- 5, see text

Synonyms
- Collis Seo, 2018

Genus of spiders

Erigomicronus is a genus of sheet weavers erected by A. V. Tanasevitch in 2018 for two east Asian species. In the following week, B. K. Seo published the new genus Collis for three Korean species. Further investigation revealed that all five belonged to the same genus, and preferences was given to the one published mere days before the other.

== Species ==
As of April 2022 it contains five species:

- E. flavus (Seo, 2018) – Korea
- E. lautus (Saito, 1984) – Japan
- E. longembolus (Wunderlich & Li, 1995) (type) – Russia (Far East), China
- E. pusillus (Seo, 2018) – Korea
- E. silvaticus (Seo, 2018) – Korea

== See also ==
- Maro
- Oreonetides
