= Trials in Burma =

1937 memoir by Maurice Collis

- Author: Maurice Collis
- Genre: Memoir
- Publication date: 1937

Trials in Burma is a memoir by Maurice Collis, an English author of Irish origin who served in Burma in the Indian Civil Service under the British Empire written in 1937 describing events in 1929-30.

After postings at Arakan, Sagaing and elsewhere, Collis was district magistrate in Rangoon in 1929-1930, a period when relations between Burmese, Indians and British became particularly difficult. In Trials in Burma he gives special attention to the political trial of Jatindra Mohan Sengupta, mayor of Calcutta, for sedition in impromptu speeches made during a brief visit to Rangoon in 1930; also to two criminal trials which became politically charged because they brought to light underlying attitudes of British merchants and army officers to Burmese people (the same attitudes that were soon to be exposed in a fictional context in George Orwell's Burmese Days). Collis's judgments were (according to his own analysis) too independent to be pleasing to the then British Government of Burma, arousing the particular disapproval of his superior, Booth Gravely, Commissioner of the Pegu Division. After giving judgment in the last of these trials Collis was hastily moved to the post of Excise Commissioner.

Trials in Burma was reviewed by Orwell in The Listener, published 9 March 1938:

This is an unpretentious book, but it brings out with unusual clearness the dilemma that faces every official in an empire like our own. Mr Collis was District Magistrate of Rangoon in the troubled period round about 1930. He had to try cases which were a great deal in the public eye, and he soon discovered the practical impossibility of keeping to the letter of the law and pleasing European opinion at the same time. Finally, for having sentenced a British Army officer to three months' imprisonment for criminal negligence in driving a car, he was reprimanded and hurriedly transferred to another post. For the same offence a native would have been imprisoned as a matter of course.

The truth is that every British magistrate in India is in a false position when he has to try a case in which European and native interests clash. In theory he is administering an impartial system of justice; in practice he is part of a huge machine which exists to protect British interests, and he has often got to choose between sacrificing his integrity and damaging his career. Nevertheless, owing to the exceptionally high traditions of the Indian Civil Service, the law in India is administered far more fairly than might be expected -- and, incidentally, far too fairly to please the business community.

A new edition of the book was published in 1945. It contains an introduction written by the author dated 14 May 1945, and commenting on events in Burma since the book was originally published.

The book was anonymously reviewed by George Orwell, who also lived in British Burma, in The Listener in 1938.
