= Commonwealth Countries League =

Commonwealth Foundation
- Logo of the Commonwealth Countries League
- Abbreviation: CCL
- Formation: 1925; 101 years ago
- Type: Intergovernmental organisation
- Website: the-ccl.org

The Commonwealth Countries League (CCL), founded in 1925 as the British Commonwealth League, is a voluntary pan-Commonwealth civil society organisation. The objectives are to secure equality of liberties, status and opportunities between men and women and to promote mutual understanding throughout the Commonwealth. The CCL is non-party and is open to men and women from all countries. It promotes the education of girls and young women and links together women’s organisations throughout the Commonwealth. In particular it raises money for its associated charity, the Commonwealth Girls Education Fund.

== History, Structure and Governance ==
=== History ===
The CCL grew from the British Commonwealth League, which in turn grew out of the British Dominion Suffrage Union (founded 1914).

The BCL was conceived as an idea in 1923 by a group of women who had been involved in the suffrage movement including Myra Sadd Brown, the League's first Treasurer. A group of Australian women had come to London to march in the suffrage parades in support of the British suffragettes, their main aim being to support women of any ethnicity, in other Dominions and colonies to get the vote. Women also came from India, the Caribbean, South Africa and other countries. The BCL was established to “promote equality of liberties, status and opportunities between women and men, and to encourage mutual understanding throughout the Commonwealth”. Myra Sadd Brown's daughter talks about her mother's BCL involvement in an interview with the historian, Brian Harrison, conducted as part of the Suffrage Interviews project, titled Oral evidence on the suffragette and suffragist movements: the Brian Harrison interviews. Appointed the League's secretary in 1925, the feminist activist, Marjorie Chave Collisson, was also interviewed as part of the project and spoke at length about the League, including its structure, work, position in the women's movement, first conference in 1925, and its president at various time, Margery Corbett-Ashby. Corbett Ashby's November 1976 interview in the project talks about the League's relationship with the International Women's Suffrage Alliance and the National Union of Women's Suffrage Societies. The first librarian of the Women's Service Library, later the Fawcett Library, and now the Women's Library, Vera Douie, refers in her interview to the connection between the BCL and the Fawcett Library, and to the BCL's addition of content to the library.

=== Mission ===
The Commonwealth Countries League works for rights and interests of women in the Commonwealth by providing a platform:

- To exchange knowledge on issues relating to families, women and girls
- To lobby the relevant authorities on those issues
- To focus on friendship and networking between Commonwealth countries
- To facilitate the co-operation between Commonwealth women’s organisations through its affiliates
- To raise funds for the secondary/high school education of girls throughout the Commonwealth

The League's objective is to advance education and civil rights and preserve and protect health throughout the Commonwealth by providing grants, items or services to other charities and / or organisations established to advance education and preserve and protect health. In particular, through the Commonwealth Girls Education Fund, to educate and empower young women as agents of change in their own communities.

=== Governance ===
The CCL is a registered charity run by a board of trustees and headed by a chairman. The charity has a patron, and a president of the executive committee is elected every 3 years at the AGM.

• Patron: Mrs. Louisa Service O.B.E., J.P., M.A.(Oxon)

• Chairman: Sir Peter Heap K.C.M.G.

• President: Duchess Williams-Alonga

=== Membership ===
Membership of the League is open to all with an interest in the aims. There are currently around 500 members, including most of the London-based High Commissioners or their spouses and a broad range of educators and supporters.

== Charitable Activities ==
The philosophy behind the CCL’s work is that educated girls with a highly developed sense of responsibility are more likely to provide a better future for themselves as well as for their communities. The primary recipient of funds from CCL activities is the Commonwealth Girls Education Fund (CGEF). Sponsorship enables girls, who have academic potential but whose parents or guardians cannot support them financially, to continue their secondary education in their own Commonwealth country. Other funding recipients include rural women’s enterprise support projects in Grenada and Ghana, and a clinic in Tanzania.

== Events ==
The league raises funds through subscriptions and events, which include afternoon teas, lunches and dinners, often hosted by a High Commission, and fashion shows. The major event of the year is the Commonwealth Fair which is held in November.

== See also ==
- Commonwealth Girls Education Fund
