= She Was a Queen =

Book by Maurice Collis

- First edition, 1937
- Author: Maurice Collis
- Language: English
- Genre: fiction
- Publisher: Faber & Faber
- Publication date: 1937
- Media type: Print
- Pages: 301
- ISBN: 9789748940380

She Was a Queen was a novel by Maurice Collis. It is a fictional embellished account of Queen Pwa Saw of the Pagan Dynasty of Burma (Myanmar).

The book was translated into Burmese by Mya Than Tint, and the translation appeared as a serial in the monthly magazine Sanda in the 1980s. The book version of the translation however was banned by the military government that came to power in 1988, reportedly because the novel's portrayal of Pwa Saw as a powerful woman drew a close comparison to Aung San Suu Kyi. The ban was lifted only in 2005.
