= His Sudden Recovery =

1914 film

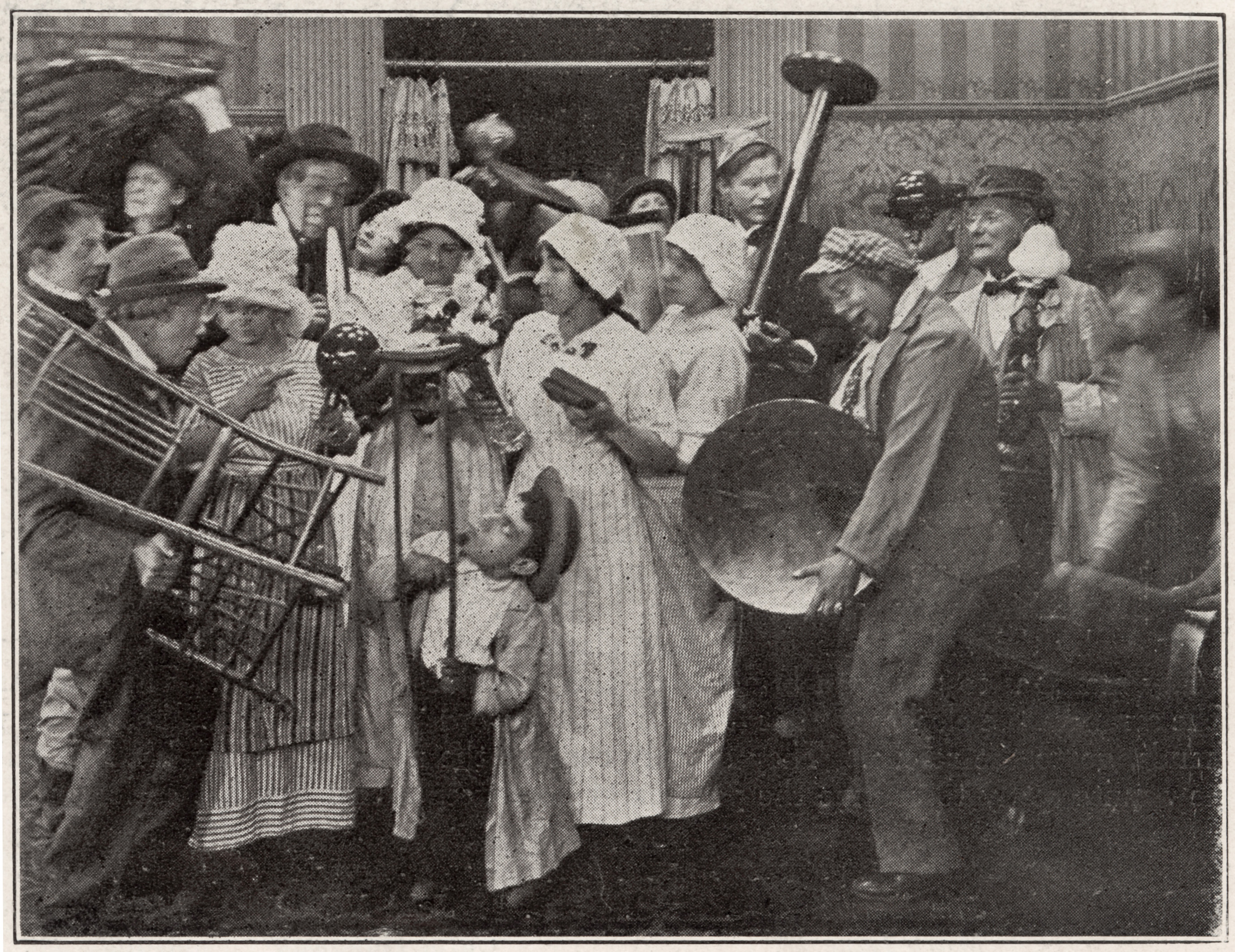
- Publicity still with the cast of His Sudden Recovery
- Written by: John A. Murphy
- Produced by: Arthur Hotaling
- Starring: Oliver Hardy; Eloise Willard; Frances Ne Moyer; Marguerite Ne Moyer
- Release date: June 27, 1914
- Running time: 5–6 minutes (c. 400 feet)
- Country: United States
- Languages: Silent film English intertitles

His Sudden Recovery is a lost 1914 American silent comedy film produced by the Lubin Manufacturing Company, featuring Oliver Hardy, Eloise Willard, Frances Ne Moyer, and Marguerite Ne Moyer.

== Plot ==
"Jones is a large, healthy man, but he reads a medical almanac and imagines he has every ailment in the book. He goes to bed sick, and great excitement prevails in the family. Everybody phones for a doctor. The physicians arrive, veterinaries, osteopaths, corn doctors, all respond. They have bitter arguments and throw out each other's medicines. The neighbors send in wine and delicacies which load the dining-room table. The doctors work on Jones until he is exhausted and he sends for all of his relatives. A swarm of relatives arrive and make it a jubilee. They consume the delicacies sent in by the neighbors and carry away the furniture. Jones hears the riot. He gets out of bed and throws the mob out of the house. An ambulance arrives. Jones throws the trained nurse and the medicines in the stretcher and tears up the almanac."

== Cast ==
- Oliver Hardy as Mr. Jones (credited as Babe Hardy)
- Eloise Williard as Mrs. Jones
- Frances Ne Moyer as their daughter
- Marguerite Ne Moyer as the Maid
- Julia Calhoun as the Trained Nurse

== Production and reception ==
His Sudden Recovery was filmed in Jacksonville, Florida, at the Jacksonville unit of the Lubin Manufacturing Company, under the supervision of Arthur Hotaling. It was a short split-reel comedy, lasting approximately 5–6 minutes, and sharing a single reel with a second, unrelated film, Who's Boss, starring Harry Lorraine, Mae Hotely, and Billy Bowers. The films were released by the General Film Company on June 27, 1914.

His Sudden Recovery is one of several short Lubin comedies made in the spring and summer of 1914 that include the first screen appearances of Oliver Hardy. Although the film itself is lost, Hardy (credited as Babe Hardy) played the leading role as the hypochondriac Mr. Jones.

The film received short but moderately favorable reviews in the trade papers. Motion Picture News summarized the plot as "The Lubin fat boy [Hardy] recovers from his serious illness when his relatives proceed to loot the house" and pronounced it "a worthy comedy"; the New York Dramatic Mirror called it "a passable farce"; and Moving Picture World wrote that "the idea in this is quite amusing and it makes a very fair half-reel comedy".

== See also ==
- List of American films of 1914
- Oliver Hardy filmography
