= Worms Will Turn =

1914 film

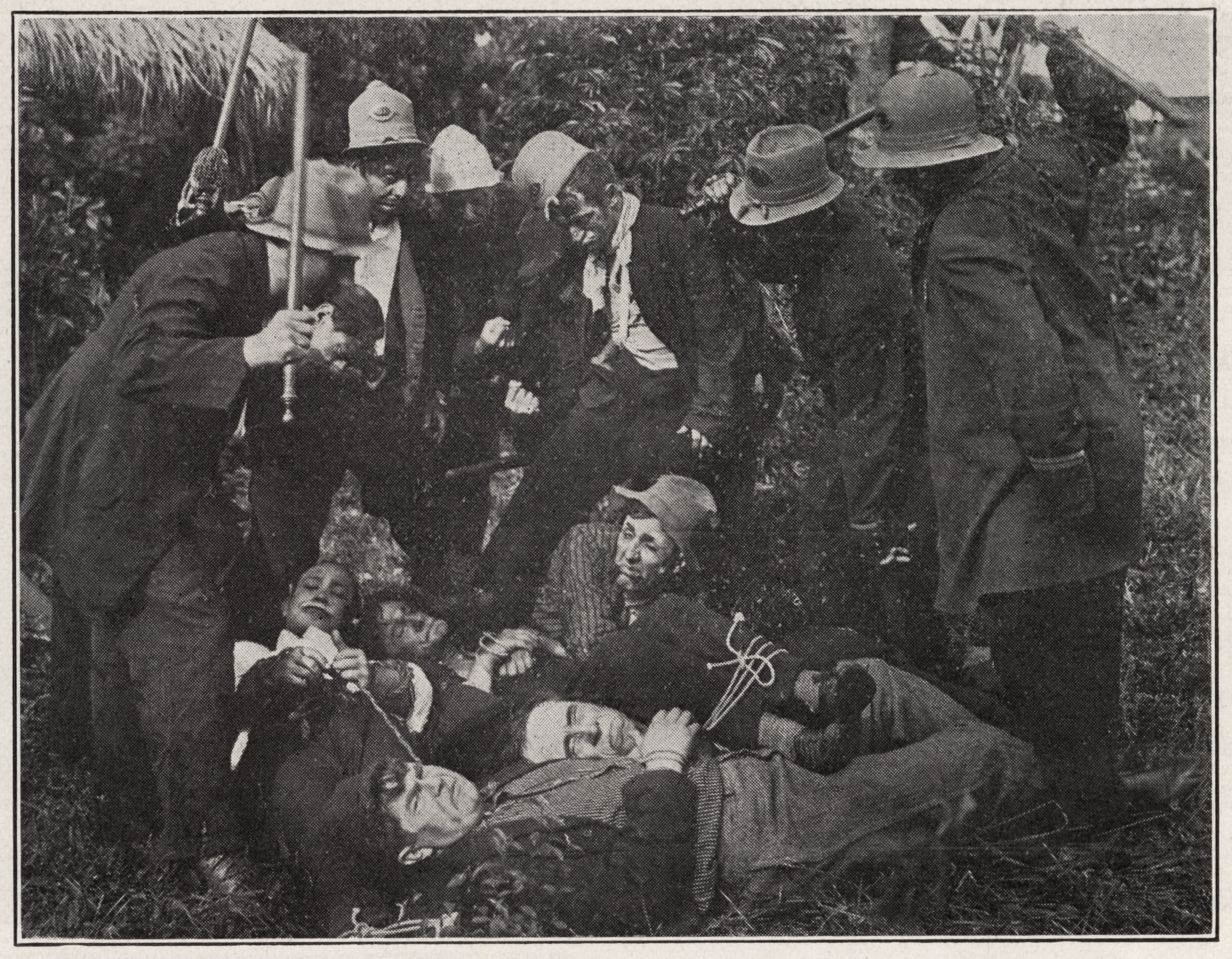
- Publicity still with the cast of Worms Will Turn
- Directed by: Frank Griffin
- Written by: Epes W. Sargent
- Produced by: Arthur Hotaling
- Starring: Raymond McKee
- Release date: July 21, 1914
- Running time: 6-7 minutes (c. 600 feet)
- Country: United States
- Languages: Silent film English intertitles

Worms Will Turn is a lost 1914 American silent comedy film produced by the Lubin Manufacturing Company, featuring Raymond McKee, Julia Calhoun, Ed Lawrence, and Oliver Hardy.

== Plot ==
Bill Raggels, a tramp, is awakened from a nap and beaten by a cop. He returns to the hobo camp and he and his fellow tramps swear revenge. They provoke the cops into chasing them and lead them into an ambush in which the cops are overpowered. The tramps seize the police station and throw the chief out a window, but they are driven away again when they become distracted by the sight of a passing woman.

== Cast ==
- Raymond McKee as Bill Raggels, a tramp
- Ed Lawrence as Police Chief
- Julia Calhoun as Matilda
- Oliver Hardy as a cop (billed as Babe Hardy)

== Production and reception ==
Worms Will Turn was filmed in Jacksonville, Florida, at the Jacksonville unit of the Lubin Manufacturing Company, under the general supervision of Arthur Hotaling. It was a short split-reel comedy, lasting approximately 6–7 minutes, and sharing a single reel of film with a second, unrelated comedy, Temper and Temperature, starring Harry Lorraine, Frances Ne Moyer, and Eloise Willard . The films were released by the General Film Company on July 21, 1914.

Worms Will Turn is one of several short Lubin comedies made in the spring and summer of 1914 that include the first screen appearances of Oliver Hardy. In this film, Hardy played the role of "a nance cop", an effeminate policeman who kindly dries the tears of the tramp and offers him a handkerchief.

The film received short but positive reviews in the trade papers. Moving Picture World wrote "This is one of those plots wherein policemen and tramps come into conflict, and chase after chase predominate. It is very hilarious in action and received a great many laughs"; Motion Picture News wrote "Here we have that funny troupe of policemen the like of whom are seen nowhere but in Lubin films. They must be seen to be appreciated, as the saying goes. The worms in this instance happen to be tramps, who conquer the squad ot police and appropriate the officers' honored uniforms to their own base uses."; and the New York Dramatic Mirror wrote that the tramps "come back heartily at the burlesque police who try to drive them out of town. The story is presented with the usual accompaniment of rough and tumble action."

== See also ==
- List of American films of 1914
- Oliver Hardy filmography
