= Jessie Mothersole =

Archaeologist, artist, author

- Born: 8 August 1873; Colchester, Essex, England
- Died: 22 April 1958 (aged 84); Kent, England
- Occupations: Archaeologist, artist, and author

Academic background
- Education: Slade School of Fine Art

Academic work
- Notable works: Hadrian's Wall

Jessie Mothersole (8 August 1873 – 22 April 1958) was an English archaeologist, artist, and author.

== Early life and education ==
Mothersole was born in Essex in 1873 and trained at the Slade School of Fine Art in London 1891–1896. During this time, she was awarded prizes and certificates in drawing from life, drawing and painting from the antique, and figure drawing. She received a Slade Scholarship in 1894. From 1899 she studied with, and then worked with, the artist Henry Holiday as his studio assistant, and was closely associated with him and his family until his death in 1927. Holiday wrote enthusiastically in his memoirs about her talent with stained glass and decorative art, and intended to bequeath her his collections of cartoons and drawings.

While at "The Slade", Mothersole was taught by Alphonse Legros, and, by her own account in 1892 when she went to speak to him, found a discarded self-portrait which had been torn into eight pieces. She kept the pieces and later donated the drawing to the Victoria and Albert Museum. She also donated a silverpoint drawing of a young woman by Ellen Lucy Grazebrook.

== Career ==
Mothersole's early work in archaeological drawing included drawings of wall paintings from Saqqara, exhibited by Flinders Petrie in an exhibition at University College London in 1904. These followed her work at the 1903–1904 excavation season at Saqqara with Margaret Murray, where, alongside drawings, Mothersole recorded the season with photographs, some of which were later published in an article "Tomb Copying in Egypt" for the family magazine Sunday at Home. Her "A Photograph Credited to Mothersole" from this period was taken at Luxor and is now in the Petrie Museum. She put on a further exhibition of her Egyptian work at Walker's Galleries, New Bond Street, London; this was Sketches in Egypt and other Works with Henry Holiday, 16–28 March 1908.

Following her early work in Egypt, in 1910 Mothersole wrote and published her first book, which concerned the Isles of Scilly, and included 24 of her own colour paintings. She then focused primarily on British archaeology, publishing her self-illustrated book on Hadrian's Wall in 1922. For this, she drew on both excavation reports and direct contacts with the archaeologists then excavating it, as well making her own observations as she walked the wall's length. Her book offers a timely commentary on the Wall's scheduling, that ensures its status as a protected ancient monument. It was "received very enthusiastically by the public and academics alike when it was published in 1922", and praised by R. G. Collingwood. Her watercolours of Hadrian's Wall were exhibited 30 October – 11 November 1922 at Walker's Galleries, London. She wrote and illustrated several more books on archaeology and travel.

Mothersole, like Henry Holiday, was a campaigner for women's suffrage. She made a drawing of a fellow campaigner, Myra Sadd Brown, at a meeting in c.1912, which is held in the archives of the Women's Library.

In 2025, Mothersole was included in an exhibition at Senate House, London, on "Women of Romano-British Archaeology".

== Select publications ==
- 1903. (Illustrator) Apuleius. The Story of Cupid & Psyche. Stuttaford, C. (ed.). London: David Nutt.
- 1905. (Illustrator) Murray, M.A. Saqqara Mastabas Part 1. London: Bernard Quaritch.
- 1910. The Isles of Scilly: Their Story, Their Folk & Their Flowers. London: The Religious Tract Society.
- 1922. Hadrian's Wall. London: The Bodley Head.
- 1924. The Saxon Shore. London: The Bodley Head.
- 1926. Czechoslovakia: The Land of an Unconquerable Ideal. London: The Bodley Head.
- 1927. Agricola's Road into Scotland: The Great Roman Road from York to the Tweed. London: The Bodley Head.
- 1927. In Roman Scotland. London: The Bodley Head.
