= Myra Sadd Brown =

Suffragette, women's rights activist and internationalist

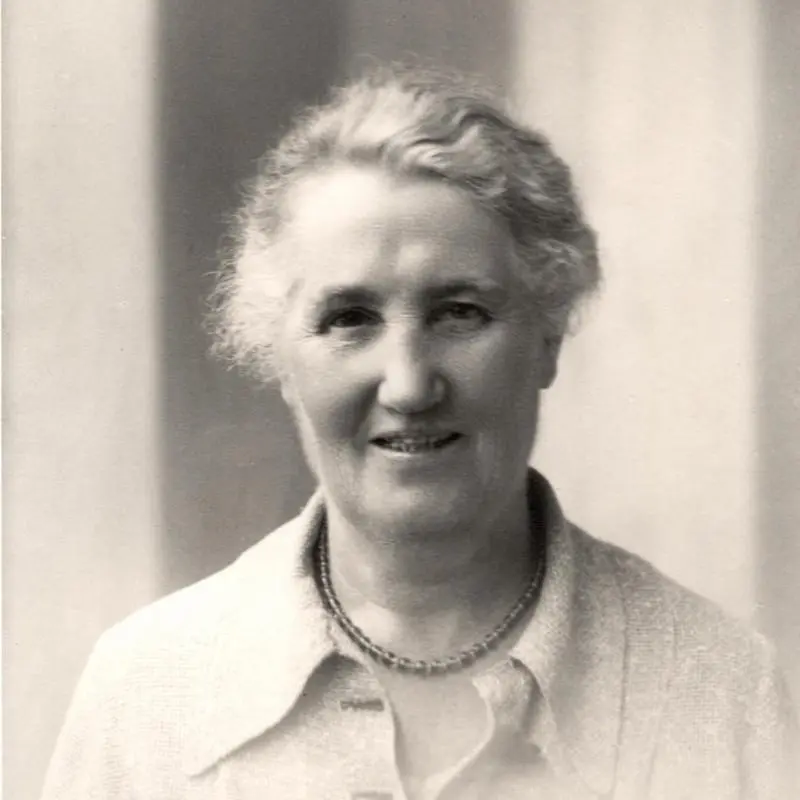
- Sadd Brown in 1937
- Born: 3 October 1872; Maldon, Essex, England
- Died: 13 April 1938 (aged 65); Kowloon, British Hong Kong
- Organization(s): Women's Social and Political Union, Women's Freedom League, International Suffrage Alliance, Commonwealth Countries League

Myra Eleanor Sadd Brown born Myra Sadd (3 October 1872 – 13 April 1938) was a campaigner for women's rights, an activist and internationalist. A suffragette, she became a member of the Women's Social and Political Union (WSPU) in 1907 and, after breaking a window at the War Office in 1912 was sentenced to two months in prison with hard labour. In prison Sadd Brown went on hunger strike as a result of which she was force-fed. On her release from prison she was awarded a Hunger Strike Medal by the WSPU.

== Early life ==
Born as Myra Eleanor Sadd in October 1872 in Maldon in Essex the tenth of eleven children of John Granger Sadd and Mary Ann née Price, her family ran a successful firm of timber merchants and processors. She was privately educated at a school in Colchester and was already interested in the campaign for women's suffrage before her marriage in July 1896 to Ernest Brown (1869–1930), a co-founder with his brother Albert Brown of Brown Brothers, a firm supplying bicycle parts and whom she met through their mutual love of cycling. The couple decorated their wedding venue, the Congregational chapel in Maldon, in purple, white and green, which later became the colours of the Women's Social and Political Union.

Like many other progressive couples of the time they combined their surname to Sadd Brown. They moved to London where they had four children including: Myra Sadd Brown (married name, Stedman, 1899–1992); Emily Price Brown (1906–1988) and Jean Frances Brown (1908–1988). Her husband's firm of Brown Brothers diversified from bicycles into electrical appliances, prams and aeroplanes. Moving into motor car manufacture in 1898 their vehicles included the Brown quadricycle. Brown Brothers became very successful ensuring the Sadd Brown family financial security.

Myra Sadd Brown's family were members of the Congregational church and later in life she became a Christian Scientist. A lover of the arts, she enjoyed the plays of George Bernard Shaw and numbered artists among her friends, including Henry Holiday and Jessie Mothersole.

== The Women's Suffrage Movement ==
Drawing of Myra Sadd Brown at a Suffragette meeting by Jessie Mothersole (1912)

Following her marriage in 1896 Myra Sadd Brown maintained her interest in the women's suffrage movement. She became a subscriber to the Central Society for Women's Suffrage in 1902 and joined the Women's Social and Political Union in 1907, also maintaining her membership of other such suffrage groups as the Women's Freedom League and the Free Church League for Woman Suffrage. Her letters publicising the cause regularly appeared in such publications as the Christian Commonwealth and she also involved her children in the fight including persuading her teenage daughter Myra to stand in the street selling copies of The Woman's Dreadnought. Later she would be involved in Sylvia Pankhurst's East London Federation of Suffragettes in which cause she would invite bus-loads of women from London's East End to her house near Maldon in Essex.

== Arrest and imprisonment ==
A Suffragette being force fed, in a contemporary poster

On 4 March 1912, Sadd Brown was arrested for throwing a brick through a window at the War Office, for which she was sentenced to two months hard labour in Holloway Prison together with a number of other suffragettes including Mrs Emmeline Pankhurst. In prison Sadd Brown, like many other suffragists, went on hunger strike but was force-fed through rubber tubes forced down her throat. On a later force-feeding Sadd Brown told the prison warders that her nose was broken but they continued to force-feed her claiming that "any pain Mrs Brown may have suffered was due to her violent resistance". Her husband Ernest, having read of her force-feeding in the press wrote to the Prison Governor demanding an explanation.

Denied writing materials, Sadd Brown wrote letters home with a blunted pencil on dark brown prison toilet paper and which were smuggled out of prison. Her letters to her husband reveal her determination to fight for the political rights of herself and other women. She wrote: "I feel therefore we have begun to strike the fear of woman if not of God into the hearts of the authorities." While on hunger strike her letter to him said: "I want you to tell all inquiring friends that I am quite well, my spirit not in the least cooled & that I think we still have the noblest cause in the world, one well worth fighting and suffering for." In a letter dated 20 March 1912 she wrote: "Mrs Pankhurst and Ethel Smyth came back to this wing yesterday... Oh just fancy these two great women sitting sewing all afternoon on garments for prisoners – can you imagine anything more ironic, it certainly does seem that the world is topsy-turvy. Why not put Asquith and Sir E. Grey to blacking boots?"In a letter to her children written on toilet paper she states: "I have such a funny little bed, which I can turn right up to the wall when I don't use it. I am learning French & German so you must work well or mummy will know lots more than you." However, in an addition to the letter she informs her husband that: "Mrs Pankhurst thinks there is enough evidence against her to give her 7 years." She wrote to her husband to let their children "know a little where I am so they can send their loving thoughts to me. They need not think because I am shut up I have done wrong." She received a Hunger Strike Medal from the WSPU on her release from prison.

== Later life and legacy ==
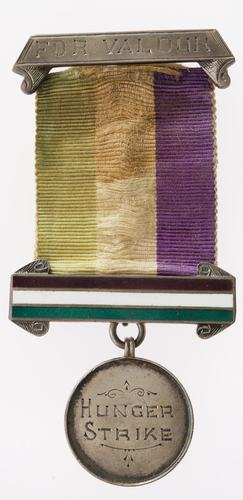
The Hunger Strike Medal awarded to Myra Sadd Brown in 1912

During World War I the Women's Social and Political Union and other groups dedicated to the campaign for women's suffrage suspended their militant actions to focus on the war effort. During this time women worked in jobs traditionally done by men, proving they could do them just as well and silencing one of the last arguments against women's suffrage. Sadd Brown hosted the Hampstead branch of the Women's Freedom League in December 1914, hearing Charlotte Despard, Anna Munro and Georgiana Solomon explain that the movement should support these workers and raising funds for the Women's Suffrage National Aid Corps.

After the war the Representation of the People Act 1918 was passed awarding the vote to women householders, or the wives of householders, aged 30 and over. On the cessation of hostilities Sadd Brown became an active member of the International Suffrage Alliance and was at the forefront of setting up of the British Commonwealth League (later the Commonwealth Countries League) in 1925, a feminist group dedicated to upholding the rights of women in Commonwealth countries. She became the League's Treasurer.

Her husband Ernest Sadd Brown, who had supported her throughout her years of campaigning and activism, died of rheumatic heart disease in 1930. In 1937 Myra Sadd Brown travelled to south-east Asia to be present at the birth of her second grandchild. She then travelled to Angkor Wat and Malaya before moving on to Hong Kong, planning to return home on the Trans-Siberian Railway. However, before she do so she suffered a stroke and died in Kowloon Hospital in Hong Kong in April 1938. She was cremated the following day at the Hindu crematory in Hong Kong. In the corner of the churchyard of the United Reformed Church in Maldon in Essex can be found a tree-shaped memorial to the Sadd family which mentions Myra Eleanor Sadd Brown.

On her death in 1938 the Commonwealth Countries League established the Sadd Brown Library, now part of the Women's Library at the London School of Economics, where her papers, her collection of books and letters to her family from prison are held. A radio item features Sadd Brown's experiences in prison from her letters and talking to her granddaughter by Beth Moss.

Sadd Brown's daughter, Myra Stedman, was interviewed, in March 1977, about her mother, by the historian, Brian Harrison, as part of the Suffrage Interviews project, titled Oral evidence on the suffragette and suffragist movements: the Brian Harrison interviews. She talks about Sadd Brown's education, non-conformism, European travel, their family life and suffrage activities, and the origins of the Sadd Brown Library. The Women's Library Archive holds a written document from Myra Stedman to be made available alongside the interview.

Her 1912 Hunger Strike Medal is held in the Collection of Museums Victoria in Melbourne in Australia.
