= Just Like a Woman (1923 film) =

1923 film

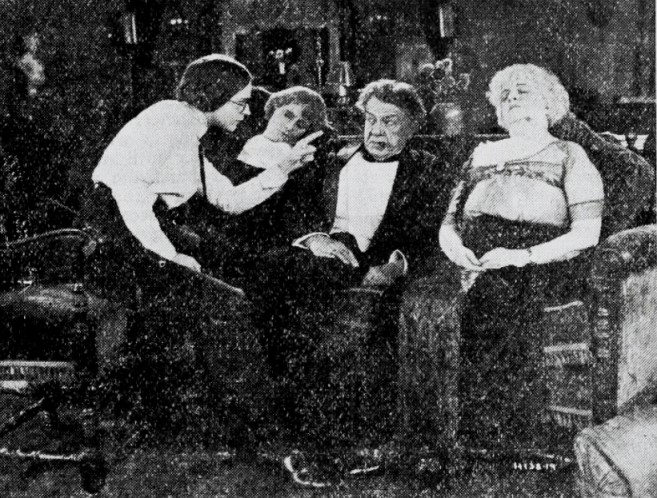
- Still from a 1923 publication
- Directed by: Scott R. Beal; Hugh McClung
- Written by: Hal Conklin; Grace S. Haskins
- Produced by: Grace S. Haskins
- Starring: Marguerite De La Motte; George Fawcett; Ralph Graves
- Cinematography: John W. Leezer; Chester A. Lyons; Reginald Lyons
- Production company: Grace S. Haskins Productions
- Distributed by: W. W. Hodkinson Corporation
- Release date: March 18, 1923
- Running time: 50 minutes
- Country: United States
- Language: Silent (English intertitles)

Just Like a Woman is a 1923 American silent comedy film directed by Scott R. Beal and Hugh McClung and starring Marguerite De La Motte, George Fawcett, and Ralph Graves.

== Cast ==
- Marguerite De La Motte as Peggy Dean
- George Fawcett as Judge Landon
- Ralph Graves as James Landon
- Jane Keckley as Abigail
- Julia Calhoun as Salina
- J. Frank Glendon as Peggy's brother

== Preservation ==
Prints of Just Like a Woman are located at the Library of Congress and George Eastman Museum Motion Picture Collection.

== Bibliography ==
- Munden, Kenneth White. The American Film Institute Catalog of Motion Pictures Produced in the United States, Part 1. University of California Press, 1997.
