= Collison (surname) =

Collison and Collisson are surnames. Notable people with the surnames include:

- C. N. Collison (1845–1929), Australian journalist, and land and patent agent
- Darren Collison (born 1987), American basketball player
- Frank Collison (born 1950), American actor
- George Collison (1772–1847), English Congregationalist and educator
- Harold Collison (1909–1995), British trade unionist
- Jack Collison (born 1988), Welsh footballer
- James Collisson (1875–1962), Canadian politician from Alberta
- John Collison (born 1990), Irish entrepreneur
- Levi Collison (1875–1965), English art publisher and printer, politician
- M. Chave Collisson (1887–1982), Australian feminist
- Meghan Collison, Canadian model
- Nick Collison (born 1980), American basketball player
- Patrick Collison (born 1988), Irish entrepreneur
- R. K. Collisson (1857–1932), Australian Anglican minister in South Australia, father of M. Chave
- William Henry Collison (1847–1922), Anglican missionary
- Wilson Collison (1893–1941), author and playwright

== See also ==
- Collinson
- Cullison (surname)
