= Brown quadricycle =

Vehicle

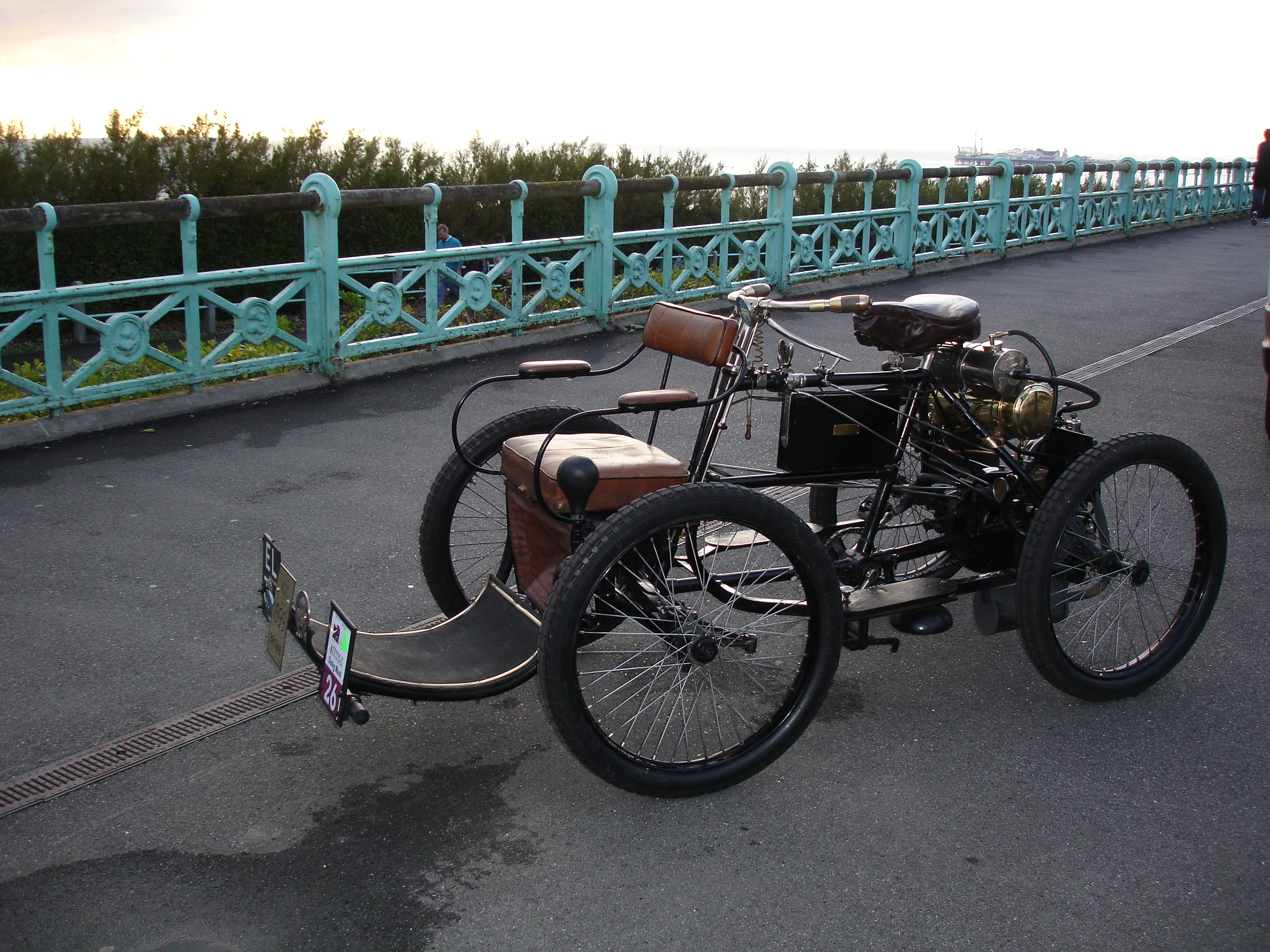
1899 Brown Quadricycle

The Brown Quadricycle was first sold in 1899 by the bicycle and motor factory, Brown Brothers of Great Eastern Street, London, UK.

The quadricycle could be bought fully assembled or all the components could be purchased separately to be built by the owner. Also available was a tricycle version and a 'convertible' model that could use either a single front wheel or have an optional twin front wheel assembly that allowed a front passenger to be carried. The only known surviving Brown Quadricycle uses a Perfecta quadricycle frame and a Starley rear axle. The engine is a 2.25 hp De Dion-Bouton engine that drives through a two speed Bozier gearbox and has been officially dated by the Veteran Car Club of Great Britain as of 1899 manufacture.

Co-founder Ernest Brown became Ernest Sadd Brown when he married the suffragette Myra Sadd Brown who came from another innovative family.

Brown Brothers later sold other vehicles that carried the Brown name but were manufactured by other makers. The Brown Brothers trade name is still in use in 2013 as Brown Brothers Distribution Ltd, part of PPG Industries (UK) Ltd.
