= The Match-Breaker =

1921 film

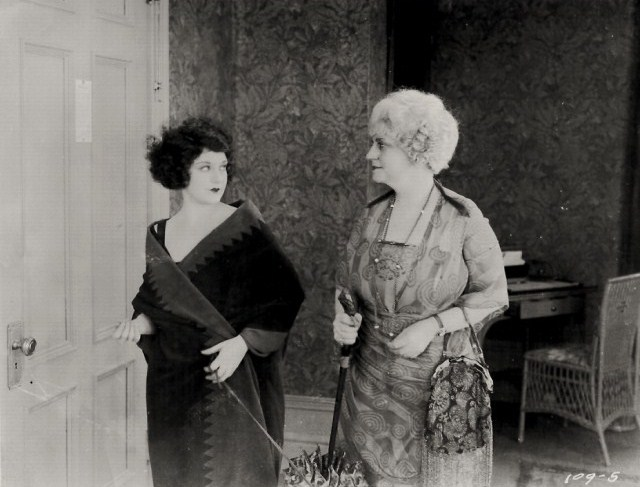
- Viola Dana and Julia Calhoun
- Directed by: Dallas M. Fitzgerald
- Written by: Arthur J. Zellner
- Story by: Metta White
- Starring: Viola Dana
- Cinematography: John Arnold
- Production company: Metro Pictures
- Distributed by: Metro Pictures
- Release date: September 19, 1921
- Running time: 5 reels; 4, 860 feet
- Country: United States
- Language: Silent (English intertitles)

The Match-Breaker is a lost 1921 American silent romantic comedy film produced and distributed by Metro Pictures. It was directed by Dallas M. Fitzgerald and starred Viola Dana.

== Cast ==
- Viola Dana as Jane Morgan
- Jack Perrin as Thomas Butler Jr
- Edward Jobson as Thomas Butler Sr.
- Julia Calhoun as Mrs. Murray
- Wedgwood Nowell as Hack De Long
- Kate Toncray as Aunt Martha
- Lenore Lynard as Madge Larlane
- Fred Kelsey as Detective
- Arthur Millett as Richard Van Loytor

== Production ==
Some of The Match-Breaker's exteriors were shot at the Hotel del Coronado.
