= C. C. Field Film Company =

US film studio company

C. C. Field Film Company, also known as Field's Feature Film Company, was a short-lived film studio company in Miami, Florida. Construction of a studio for the company at South Miami Avenue at 25th Street began in 1915. It was headed by Charles C. Field who also established the Prismatic Film Company, its predecessor. Field relocated to Hollywood before returning to Florida in 1916. His partner took over and soon after the company ceased operations having produced only a few films. The studio building was later used by Tilford's studio.

Field responded to film recruitment efforts by Miami's Chamber of Commerce. After producing a promotional film for the city was produced by his Prismatic Studio, he left for Hollywood. He returned in 1916 and set up Field's Feature Film Company which became Florida Film Company when his partner took over.

The studio operated with two sets of 44 member cast and crew units. William A. Howell left Thanhouser to work for Field. Alice Hollister and George Hollister also joined it. Noah Beery was one of the studio's starring actors. Julia Calhoun was also contracted as an actress.

"Tomato King" Thomas Peters was his partner in the studio building project and took over when the company's first films struggled to find buyers and received unfavorable reviews.

A screening office was opened in New York City. Three five-reel film were produced.

== Establishment ==
Field arrived in Miami by private railcar. He was later described as "half movie producer and half con man" and negotiated with the City Council for his Prismatic Film Company.

== Filmography ==
- The Magic City of the South, a promotional film about Miami (Prismatic Film Company)
- The Human Orchid
- The Toll of Justice, according to IMDb it was a bigoted Ku Klux Klan film that offended Thomas Dixon Jr., author of The Clansman, on which The Birth of a Nation was based.
- Fate's Chessboard, alternative title Fate's Bond (completed in 1916, unclear whether it was ever released), the film featured actors portraying Seminole Indians
