= John Stewart Collis =

Irish biographer, rural author and pioneer of the ecology movement

- Born: 16 February 1900; Dublin, Ireland
- Died: 2 March 1984 (aged 84)
- Education: Balliol College, Oxford
- Occupations: Biographer, rural writer
- Known for: The Worm Forgives the Plough
- Relatives: Maurice Collis (elder brother); Robert Collis (twin brother)

John Stewart Collis (16 February 1900 – 2 March 1984) was an Irish biographer, rural author, and pioneer of the ecology movement. He is known for his book The Worm Forgives the Plough based on his wartime experience working in the Land Army in the Second World War.

== Early life and education ==
Collis was born at Kilmore, Killiney on the borders of County Dublin and County Wicklow, Ireland, twin son (the other being the writer and paediatrician Robert Collis) of successful Irish solicitor, William Stewart Collis, of Collis and Ward, 13, Clare Street, Dublin, and Edith Lilla, née Barton. His mother neglected Collis in favour of his twin, leading to an independent, self-sufficient nature. Both his grandfathers had been well-known Dublin surgeons. His elder brother was the writer and biographer Maurice Collis.

Collis was educated at Aravon preparatory school in Bray, Co. Wicklow, Rugby School and Balliol College, Oxford. At the Oxford Union, he learned the art of public speaking, hearing politicians and authors including H. H. Asquith, G. K. Chesterton, Lloyd George and W. B. Yeats in the debating chamber.

== Biographer ==
In the 1920s, Collis became a close friend of the Guernsey-born G. B. Edwards, who lodged at his flat in Guilford Street. Both men became protégés of John Middleton Murry and contributed to The Adelphi magazine but later drifted apart. Collis, however, wrote an enthusiastic review of Edwards's The Book of Ebenezer Le Page in the Spectator when this novel was posthumously published in 1981.

Collis's first book, a biography of George Bernard Shaw, was published in 1925, followed by biographies of Havelock Ellis, August Strindberg, Leo Tolstoy, the Carlyles and Christopher Columbus.

== Country writing ==
Collis is remembered largely for While Following the Plough (1946) and Down to Earth (1947: as one volume, The Worm Forgives the Plough, 1973).

While Following the Plough was inspired by the years he chose to spend working as a farm labourer in the Land Army (which mainly consisted of women, known as "land girls") in Sussex and Dorset during the Second World War. He worked at J. G. Maynard's farm at Stonegate in Sussex in 1940 for a year, and then moved to Tarrant Hinton in Dorset for the rest of the war. The manuscript of the book was rejected by twelve publishers. At last, Jonathan Cape accepted it, but requested much revision. Collis waited for a while and returned the manuscript largely unchanged, thanking the publisher for their suggestions; Jonathan Cape answered saying they were "delighted with the improvements".

Down to Earth was inspired by the year he spent working for Rolf Gardiner after the war, thinning a fourteen-acre wood on his own, using only an axe and other hand tools.

== Reception ==
The novelist Margaret Drabble states that Collis wrote with imagination and authenticity about rural life, and that Collis's autobiography Bound upon a Course brought him belated recognition as a pioneer in the ecology movement.

The travel writer Robert Macfarlane praises his country writing as follows:

Two remarkable books emerged from these years ... Both books are structured as a mosaic of tiny essaylets, riffs, visions, meditations and comic set-pieces (such as 'My Furrow', where he describes ploughing his first field-length, the result resembling a woozy sine-wave rather than a furrow, or his account of the blustery farmer Arthur Miles, whose favourite – and often only – word was 'bugger').

The biographer Michael Holroyd comments that While Following the Plough and Down to Earth were "acclaimed on their appearance", and are now considered classics.

== Legacy ==
In 1986, Richard Ingrams wrote John Stewart Collis: A Memoir (Chatto & Windus). A 2009 edition of The Worm Forgives the Plough, with an introduction by Robert Macfarlane, was issued by Vintage Classics.

== Personal life ==
In 1929, after only a week of acquaintance, he married Eirene Joy, who worked in cerebral palsy research, including as Chief Cerebral Palsy Therapist to the London County Council and Assistant to the Director of the Cerebral Palsy Unit, Queen Mary's Hospital for Children, Carshalton, Surrey. They had two daughters. His married life was characterised by "several years of financial insecurity and domestic unhappiness". His first wife died in 1970. In 1974, he married secondly, Irene Adela, Lady Beddington-Behrens (1906-1989), née Ash, widow of businessman and arts patron Major Sir Edward Beddington-Behrens.

== Bibliography ==
=== Individual Works ===
- Shaw (1925)
- Forward to Nature (1927)
- Farewell to Argument (1935)
- The Sounding Cataract (1936)
- An Irishman's England (1937)
- While Following the Plough (1946)
- Down to Earth (1947)
- The Triumph of the Tree (1950)
- The Moving Waters (1955)
- Paths of Light (UK, 1959) / The World of Light (US, 1960)
- An Artist of Life (1959)
- Marriage and Genius: Strindberg and Tolstoy, Studies in Tragi-Comedy (1963)
- Leo Tolstoy (1969)
- Bound upon a Course: An Autobiography (1971)
- The Carlyles (1971)
- Christopher Columbus (1976)
- Living with a Stranger (1978)

=== Omnibus Editions ===
- The Vision of Glory (1972), containing selections from —
  - The Triumph of the Tree
  - The Moving Waters
  - Paths of Light
- The Worm Forgives the Plough (1973)
  - While Following the Plough
  - Down to Earth
