= Fred Collinson =

English footballer

Personal information
- Full name: Frederick Marginson Collinson
- Date of birth: 1874
- Place of birth: Bolton, England
- Date of death: 15 May 1915 (aged 41)
- Place of death: Cape Helles, Ottoman Turkey
- Positions: Outside left; centre half

Senior career*
| Years | Team | Apps | (Gls) |
| 1894–1895 | Everton | 0 | (0) |
| 1895–1896 | Bury | 1 | (1) |
| 1896–1898 | Chorley | | |
| 1898–1899 | Blackburn Rovers | 0 | (0) |
| 1899 | Darwen | 9 | (0) |
- * Club domestic league appearances and goals

Frederick Marginson Collinson (1874 – 15 May 1915) was an English footballer who played as an outside left in the Football League for Darwen and Bury.

== Personal life ==
Collinson joined the Lancashire Fusiliers of the British Army at age 15 in 1889 and stated his age was 18. He was transferred to the reserve in 1895, but was recalled to rejoin the Fusiliers in November 1899 and saw action at Spion Kop and Ladysmith during the Second Boer War. Collinson was honourably discharged in April 1902 and by 1911, he was married with two children and working as a gas meter inspector. He re-enlisted in the Lancashire Fusiliers in Bury during the early months of the First World War and was sent to Gallipoli with his battalion in May 1915. Two days after his arrival, Collinson was wounded in action by rounds from an Ottoman heavy machine gun. A second lieutenant wrote of his wounding:

Eventually we got to the trench behind the front line. Next to me was an old soldier called Collinson. We got out of the trench and had to go at the double because the fire was very heavy. The bullets were hissing round, swish, swish, swish, swish, swish. We ran halfway and then we got behind a mound. I said to Collinson: "Look, we've got to go on," and off we set again. I wasn't too bad a runner and I outstripped Collinson and eventually leapt into the front line trench. I'm sorry to say that Collinson, in the last ten yards, got hit though the chest or stomach. We got him in but he died later.

— Second Lieutenant Horridge

Collinson died of his wound on 15 May 1915, seven days after he received it. He has no known grave and is commemorated on the Helles Memorial.
