= Collison House =

Collison House may refer to:

- Collison House (Bald Knob, Arkansas), listed on the National Register of Historic Places in White County, Arkansas
- Collison House (Newport, Delaware), listed on the National Register of Historic Places in New Castle County, Delaware
