= Veteran Car Club of Great Britain =

Automobile associations in the United Kingdom

The Veteran Car Club of Great Britain
- VCC of GB Logo
- Abbreviation: VCC of GB
- Formation: 1930
- Founders: S C H Davis, J A Masters and J H Wylie
- Purpose: To encourage and promote the preservation and use of veteran and Edwardian vehicles
- Location: Jessamine Court, 15 High Street, Ashwell, Hertfordshire SG7 5NL UK
- Region served: World-wide
- Members: (1500 in 2016)
- Publication: Veteran Car
- Subsidiaries: Veteran Car Company Limited previously, 2002 to 2010, known as Veteran Car Services Limited
- Website: http://www.vccofgb.co.uk/

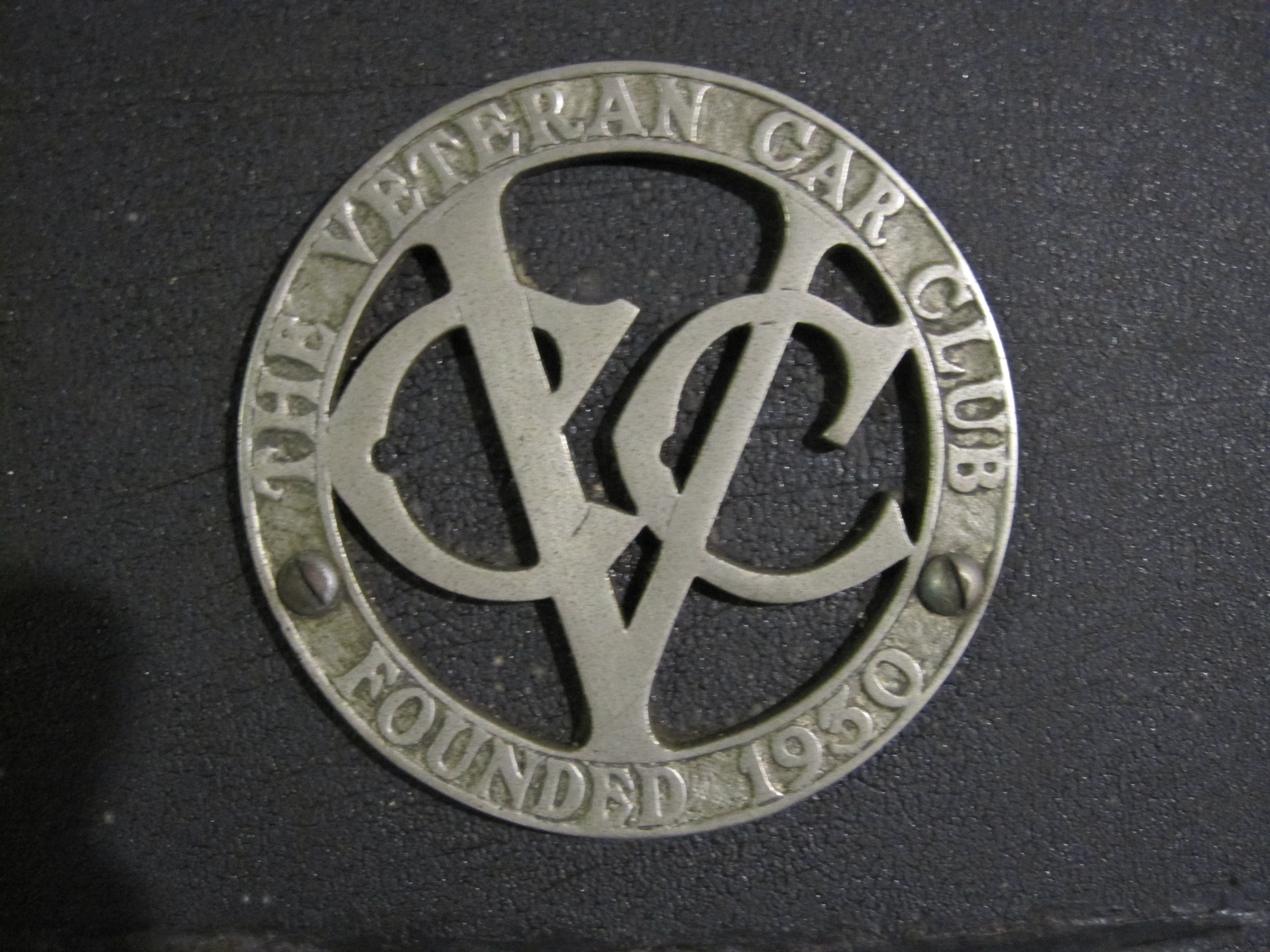

The Veteran Car Club of Great Britain is a private members' club formed to encourage the preservation and use of veteran and Brass or Edwardian vehicles, whose activities include the promotion and organisation of events and rallies, dating and identification of motor vehicles and acquisition and maintenance of a library and archive connected with early motoring.

== Scope ==
The club caters for cars built before 1905 (known as 'veteran') and those built between 1905 and the end of 1918 (known as 'Edwardian').

== History ==
The club was founded by racing driver and sports editor of Autocar, Sammy Davis, with Jackie Masters and John Wylie at the Ship Hotel in Brighton, England following the 1930 RAC London to Brighton run. It was the world's first club for antique car enthusiasts.

They formed the club to encourage and foster the preservation and use of vehicles eligible for the Brighton run, those built before 1905. The scope was extended to Edwardian cars in the 1950s, now defined as those built after 1904 but before 1919 (an earlier cut-off date was applied during the 1950s and 1960s).

By 1937 a considerable archive had been accumulated by the club. The Scotsman noted that the club issued certificates of authenticity of date. The membership included remaining well-known pioneers of motoring. In the 1937 Brighton run there had been 116 cars and 105 of those cars belonged to club members. Club members owned 140 cars in roadworthy condition all built before 1905. There were 235 members of the club. In 1950 a rally and reliability trial in Oxford attracted 84 cars, the oldest an 1895 Lutzmann with a 4 hp single-cylinder engine.

== Club activities ==
The Veteran Car Club of Great Britain organises events, rallies and other activities to encourage the preservation and use of veteran and Edwardian vehicles. It offers members a dating and identification service for early motor vehicles and maintains a library and archive connected with early motoring.
