= Ted Collinson =

Australian rules footballer, born 1907

Personal information
- Full name: Ted Collinson
- Born: 26 May 1907
- Died: 17 June 1982 (aged 75)
- Original team: Richmond Brewery
- Height: 175 cm (5 ft 9 in)
- Weight: 70 kg (154 lb)

Playing career^{1}
Years	Club	Games (Goals)
1932	Richmond	4 (1)
- ^{1} Playing statistics correct to the end of 1932.

Ted Collinson (26 May 1907 – 17 June 1982) was a former Australian rules footballer who played with Richmond in the Victorian Football League (VFL).
