= M. Chave Collisson =

Marjorie Chave Collisson
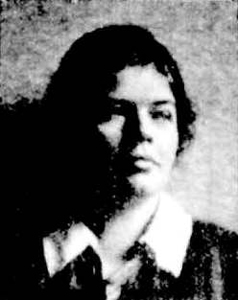
- Born: 5 February 1887; Muncie, Indiana, USA
- Died: 14 April 1982 (aged 95); London, England
- Education: University of Sydney, Columbia University
- Occupation: Suffragist

Marjorie Chave Collisson (5 February 1887 – 14 April 1982), generally known as Chave or M. Chave Collisson, was an activist in Australia and Great Britain for several feminist causes.

== Early life and education ==
Collisson was born in the United States the elder daughter of Rev. Reginald Kingsmill Collisson (1857 – 5 August 1932) and his Irish-born wife Katherine (or Catherine) Elizabeth Collisson, née Gamble (1862 – 28 December 1944). The Rev. R. K. Collisson was born in London; his father was an Anglican clergyman, as were his three brothers. He served the Church in England for ten years; four years in the United States; the remainder of his 51 years' service was spent in Tasmania and South Australia. His last and longest charge was the Church of the Epiphany, Crafers, where many of Adelaide's leading lights were married.

Collisson's sister Nora Winifred Collisson (died 1963) was headmistress of Lowther Hall Church of England Grammar School for Girls, and author of The Warrior and a play To the Day. Chave Collisson was educated at home, the Collegiate School, Hobart, and Sydney University, where she was elected one of the first directors of the newly founded Women's Club and the first secretary of University of Sydney Women's Union. She spent a year on the staff of the university as Assistant to the Director of Tutorial Classes and Lecturer in History. She was active in the Workers' Educational Association and a proponent of further education for women, so they could take a leading place as workers and citizens.

In 1919 Collisson earned her MA from Columbia University in New York.

== Career ==
During World War I, Collisson was an organiser for the Red Cross Society among university students. She strongly supported the push for conscription, often appearing on the same platform as the NSW Premier, W. A. Holman, and insisted that soldiers should not be returned to Australian society until they were physically and mentally fit. One of her brothers was killed in the War, and the other seriously injured. Collison was an ardent monarchist: in 1924 she was presented to Queen Mary, who remembered Rev. Collisson fondly.

In 1925 she was appointed secretary of the British Commonwealth League, an offshoot of the International Woman Suffrage Alliance.

Collisson was, with Bessie Rischbieth, a founder of the Women's Non-party Political Association. She represented the Australian Equal Citizenship Federation at the International Woman Suffrage Alliance summit in Paris in 1926. She was the organiser of Maude Royden's tour of Australia and New Zealand in 1928 and her companion throughout the tour. She was a delegate to the International Women's Congress in Berlin in June 1929.

Brian Harrison recorded an oral history interview with Collisson in November 1976 as part of the Suffrage Interviews project, titled Oral evidence on the suffragette and suffragist movements: the Brian Harrison interviews. In it she recalls her education and early career in Australia, her work with the British Commonwealth League and her time with Maude Royden.

While continuing to represent Australian feminists, Collisson spent most of her life in London, living in hotels, and in later years, the Nightingale House care home, Twickenham. She died in London and was cremated.
