= Cullison (surname) =

Cullison is a surname. Notable people with the surname include:

- Bob Cullison (1936–2021), American politician
- Bonnie Cullison (born 1954), American teacher, labor official, and politician
- James B. Cullison (1857–1936), American judge

== See also ==
- Collison (surname)
