= Lucy Collinson =

Scientist

- Awards: MSA Distinguished Scientist Award
- Scientific career
- Fields: Electron microscopy
- Workplaces: Francis Crick Institute
- Website: Lucy Collinson's Profile

Lucy Collinson is a microbiologist and electron microscopist at the Francis Crick Institute, a biomedical research centre in London. She was previously the head of electron microscopy at the London Research Institute.

== Life and career ==
In 1998, Collinson received a PhD in molecular microbiology from the Barts and The London School of Medicine and Dentistry of the Queen Mary University of London, supervised by Mike Curtis. She became interested in electron microscopy towards the end of her PhD, after the excitement of seeing the bacteria after years of studying bacterial protein bands on gels. That same year, she became a postdoctoral research assistant at Imperial College London and University College London, working with Colin Hopkins.

In 2004, Collinson became the head of electron microscopy at a molecular cell biology laboratory at University College London. In 2006, Collinson became the head of electron microscopy at the Cancer Research UK London Research Institute. In 2013, she collaborated with a team of researchers at the University of York on a large collaborative grant to the UK Medical Research Council to purchase a new type of combined electron and light microscope. In 2015, when the London Research Unit became part of the Francis Crick Institute, she became the head of electron microscopy there. In her role as head of that effort she is involved in many collaborative projects, publishing on a range of topics.

In 2019, Collinson co-edited Correlative Imaging: Focusing on the Future with Paul Verkade, which was published by Wiley. She guest edited a volume of Journal of Cell Science with Guillaume Jacquemet.

In 2024, she received the Distinguished Scientist Award in biological sciences from the Microscopy Society of America.
