= Leopold Henry Collinson =

New Zealand businessman and racehorse breeder

Leopold Henry Collinson (13 May 1878 – 25 January 1954) was a New Zealand businessman, racehorse breeder and trainer, community leader. He was born in Palmerston North, Manawatu/Horowhenua, New Zealand on 13 May 1878.
