= Maro (spider) =

Scientific classification
- Kingdom: Animalia
- Phylum: Arthropoda
- Subphylum: Chelicerata
- Class: Arachnida
- Order: Araneae
- Infraorder: Araneomorphae
- Family: Linyphiidae
- Genus: Maro; O. Pickard-Cambridge, 1907

Type species
- M. minutus O. Pickard-Cambridge, 1907

Species
- 13, see text

Synonyms
- Micronetata Dahl, 1912

Genus of spiders

Maro is a genus of dwarf spiders that was first described by Octavius Pickard-Cambridge in 1907.

== Species ==
As of September 2022 it contains thirteen species:

- Maro bureensis Tanasevitch, 2006 – Russia (Far East)
- Maro flavescens (O. Pickard-Cambridge, 1873) – Russia (South Siberia, Far East), Mongolia
- Maro khabarum Tanasevitch, 2006 – Russia (Far East)
- Maro lehtineni Saaristo, 1971 – Europe (Central and Northern)
- Maro lepidus Casemir, 1961 – Europe
- Maro minutus O. Pickard-Cambridge, 1907 (type) – Europe
- Maro nearcticus Dondale & Buckle, 2001 – Canada, USA, Mexico
- Maro pansibiricus Tanasevitch, 2006 – Russia (Europe to Far East)
- Maro perpusillus Saito, 1984 – Japan
- Maro saaristoi Eskov, 1980 – Russia (Siberia, Far East, Sakhalin)
- Maro sibiricus Eskov, 1980 – Russia (Europe to Far East/East Siberia)
- Maro sublestus Falconer, 1915 – Europe, Russia (Europe to West Siberia)
- Maro ussuricus Tanasevitch, 2006 – Russia (Far East)
