= Collis (given name) =

Collis is a masculine given name borne by:

- Collis Birmingham (born 1984), Australian middle- and long-distance runner
- Collis Featherstone (1913–1990), Australian convert to the Baháʼí faith
- Collis Potter Huntington (1821–1900), American railway executive
- Collis Jones (born 1949), American former basketball player
- Collis King (born 1951), West Indies former first-class cricketer
- Collis Temple (born 1952), American former basketball player
