= Oreonetides =

Scientific classification
- Kingdom: Animalia
- Phylum: Arthropoda
- Subphylum: Chelicerata
- Class: Arachnida
- Order: Araneae
- Infraorder: Araneomorphae
- Family: Linyphiidae
- Genus: Oreonetides; Strand, 1901

Type species
- O. vaginatus (Thorell, 1872)

Species
- 17, see text

Synonyms
- Aigola Chamberlin, 1922; Labuella Chamberlin & Ivie, 1943; Montitextrix Denis, 1963; Paramaro Wunderlich, 1980

Genus of spiders

Oreonetides is a genus of dwarf spiders that was first described by Embrik Strand in 1901.

== Species ==
As of May 2019 it contains seventeen species:

- Oreonetides badzhalensis Eskov, 1991 – Russia (Far East)
- Oreonetides beattyi Paquin, Dupérré, Buckle & Lewis, 2009 – USA
- Oreonetides beringianus Eskov, 1991 – Russia (E-Siberia, Far East)
- Oreonetides filicatus (Crosby, 1937) – Canada, USA
- Oreonetides flavescens (Crosby, 1937) – USA, Canada
- Oreonetides flavus (Emerton, 1915) – USA, Canada
- Oreonetides glacialis (L. Koch, 1872) – Europe
- Oreonetides helsdingeni Eskov, 1984 – Russia
- Oreonetides kolymensis Eskov, 1991 – Russia
- Oreonetides minimus Tanasevitch, 2017 – Russia (Far East)
- Oreonetides quadridentatus (Wunderlich, 1972) – Belgium, Germany, Austria
- Oreonetides rectangulatus (Emerton, 1913) – USA
- Oreonetides rotundus (Emerton, 1913) – USA, Canada
- Oreonetides sajanensis Eskov, 1991 – Russia
- Oreonetides shimizui (Yaginuma, 1972) – Russia, Japan
- Oreonetides taiwanus Tanasevitch, 2011 – Taiwan
- Oreonetides vaginatus (Thorell, 1872) (type) – North America, Europe, Russia (European to Far East), Japan
