= Edward Collinson (cricketer) =

New Zealand cricketer

Personal information
- Full name: Edward Thomas Collinson
- Born: 2 November 1849; Derby, England
- Died: 24 September 1920 (aged 70); Melbourne, Australia
- Role: Occasional wicket-keeper

Domestic team information
- Years: Team
- 1868/69–1885/86: Otago
- Source: ESPNcricinfo, 7 May 2016

Edward Thomas Collinson (2 November 1849 – 24 September 1920) was a New Zealand cricketer. He played sixteen first-class matches for Otago between the 1868–69 and 1885–86 seasons.

Collinson was born at Derby in England in 1849. He worked as a solicitor and died at Melbourne in Australia in 1920. As well as playing, he also umpired in first-class matches.
