= Brown Brothers Tobacco Company =

- Industry: Tobacco
- Founded: c. 1880
- Founders: Robert Brown; John Brown

Brown Brothers Tobacco Company was located at 119 State Street in Detroit. The building was built for brothers, Robert Hamilton Brown and John Brown who founded a cigar manufacturing business which was, at one time, the largest cigar factory under one roof in the world. Brown Brothers were known for the following cigar brands: Newsboys, Cremo, Fontella, Carmencita, Evangeline and Detroit Free Press.

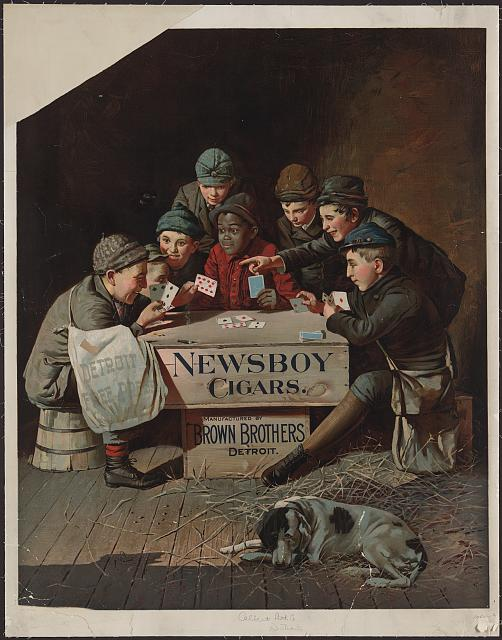
Newsboy cigars. Manufactured by Brown Brothers, Detroit

== Company founding ==
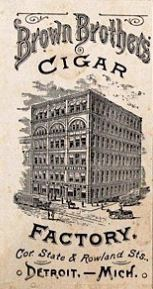
Detroit Free Press Advertisement 9 Aug 1885

Robert Brown, born in Ohio of Irish descent, and his brother, John H. Brown, founded the firm. Robert was a Civil War veteran who received honorable discharge, having been a private in an Ohio regiment. In the late 1800s, Brown moved to Detroit and started a fire insurance, real estate and lumber business with his brother John (who had previously moved to Detroit) on Griswold Street in Detroit. They later started the cigar business on Monroe Avenue and John managed the enterprise.

== Building ==
In 1887, famed Detroit architect, Gordon W. Lloyd designed the company's new building at 119 State Street in Detroit. Lloyd was an influential architect known for his Gothic Revival and later Romanesque Revival designs. The building was originally at 33 State Street prior to the renumbering of buildings in Detroit which occurred in 1921, after which the building became located at 119 State Street.

== Advertising ==
Advertising for its brands included cabinet cards of prominent performers for Newsboy.

== Cigar strike 1895 ==
In the summer of 1895, a city-wide strike of the unionized cigar makers occurred as a result of the manufacturers utilizing lower cost and wage options such as machine rolling and female employees and child labor. In June of that year, the local union president authorized the strike indicating that all men could walk out. The issue of female and child labor became a cause-celeb in this struggle with an executive in the American Federation of Labor being quoted as saying:

When a cigar manufacturer runs a "Union shop" and employs union men and women he is allowed the use of the Cigar Makers' International Union blue-label, which guarantees to the public that the cigars having this label upon the box have been made by well paid, clean and skilled labor, but when a manufacturer...takes cigars made by underpaid women and children and mixes them with the cigars made by union labor in his regular shop, he not only takes advantage of the helpless women and children, but aims to reduce wages and impare [sic] the standard of workmanship of union labor, and through false pretenses defrauds the smokers of Union labeled cigars.

The strike wore on throughout the summer and in August, the Brown Brothers made headlines by importing fifty scab laborers from Cuba under the guise that these men would be involved with the manufacture of high end, Havana cigars only. The strikers assumed that the Cubans would be replacing the female workers who went on strike in June of that year.

By 1897, the American Federation of Labor placed the Brown Brothers tobacco products on the "unfair" list as not being fully in support of organized labor or an organized labor workforce. Pro-labor newspapers carried stories of the firm employing only women and children and not paying a union wage. Tensions were clearly not assuaged from the recent strike. Several other cigar manufacturers, including, the American Tobacco Company, were placed on the more punitive, "do not patronize" list. By 1900, however, the Brown Brothers were added to the "do not patronize" list.

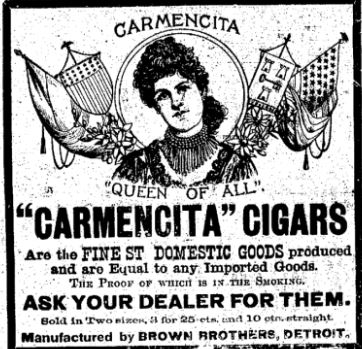
Advertisement of Brown Brothers' Cigars from 1894

== Company operations ==
In 1899, the company filed suit in Ohio court against Frank Torrence, a former employee and travelling salesman of Brown Brothers and against Bucher and Bucher Company of Ohio. The suit alleged that Torrence and Bucher conspired to offer a substandard 5-cent cigar, by the trade name of "La Camerita", to under-cut Brown Brothers by deceiving the customers who were interested in buying Brown Brothers' premium 10-cent cigar by the similar name of "Carmencita". The suit alleged that "La Camerita" was a "fanciful name invented and adopted by the defendant because of its close resemblance to the trade-mark of the plaintiff" (Brown Brothers). The suit further alleged that the former salesman, Torrence was an irresponsible person financially. Citing Bradbury v Beeton, a suit between the comic strip "Punch" and "Punch and Judy", the court found in favor of the defendant and injunctions against the defendant were removed. The court ruled that there was not sufficient proof that Torrence (and Bucher and Bucher) intended to deceive the public.

== American Cigar Company ==
The American Cigar Company was incorporated in 1901 with an initial capitalization of $10 million, later increased to $20 million. The American Tobacco Company and the Continental Tobacco Company forged a business arrangement with Powell, Smith and Company to compete on a larger scale in the business of cigar manufacture and sales. American and Continental each acquired 46.5% of the new entity and Powell the remaining 7%. In 1901, the American Cigar Company, purchased Brown Brothers Tobacco for over $469,000 in stock and cash and renamed it "Brown Brothers' Branch, American Cigar Co." At the time, Brown Brothers had an annual capacity of over 40 million cigars, 1,076 employees and was the largest manufacturer of cigars under one roof in the world. When the firm purchased Brown Brothers, press reports indicated another 1,000 employees would be hired at the factory.

Initially, John Brown was retained as the manager of the operation however, he resigned in May 1902 after being directed to reduce operating expenses which meant a reduction in workers' wages. Brown officially claimed that he resigned due to "ill health" and the "need for a rest". In protest of Brown's departure and with concerns of wage cuts, the employees staged a strike. The strike involved 1200 female and 50 male employees. In a speech to the striking employees in late May 1902, Brown admitted that he did not like having to report to the third vice-president of the American Cigar Company; a man named "Weiss". He did however, encourage the employees to return to work, stating, "Go back to work. Go back until you find your wages are really being cut and then quit." The employees refused to listen to Brown and remained out on strike through June. The women formed a union but in the end, lost the strike and Brown Brothers remained a non-union enterprise.

By July 1903, John Brown had raised over $1M in capitalization to found an independent cigar manufacturing company that would compete against the "trust" or against the American Cigar Company as it moved to monopolize the cigar industry. Later that year, John's brother Robert, died in Florida, having suffered as an invalid for the last eight years of his life.

Through 1906, the American Tobacco Company purchased a number of other cigar and cheroot manufacturers across the country and into Cuba and Puerto Rico. The next year, trade journals began to report that the American Tobacco Company did not intend to renew its lease on the Brown Brothers factory on State Street in Detroit. Rather, they intended to build a new factory in the Polish district of the city where the majority of the workers resided. By 1910, it was announced that the American Cigar Company had purchased a build site and intended to build a seven story factory. The business was managed by William Lichtig at the factory, a position he had held since 1903 shortly after John Brown left the operation. Lichtig left the business in 1911 to form the Surety Cigar Company along with Mose Eisenberg in 1911.

In 1911, in a landmark antitrust case against American Tobacco, United States v. American Tobacco Co. the courts ruled that the company had violated the Sherman Antitrust Act and divestiture of American Tobacco was ordered.

The obituary of John H Brown was announced in the United States Tobacco Journal. He died in early 1914 at the age of 65 and was survived by four sons: Percy M., John Stanley, Harry and Alfred D. Brown. At the end of his life, he was the owner of Clark Mineral Springs Company in Detroit.

By 1921, the American Cigar Company was still in operation in Detroit. The factory was then located at 3818 Beaubien Street.

== 21st century ==
In September 2015, it was announced that the building at 119 State Street would be sold to Lear Automotive by Dan Gillbert's Bedrock Real Estate Services.

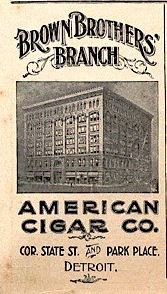
Brown Brothers' Branch American Cigar Co. newspaper advertisement

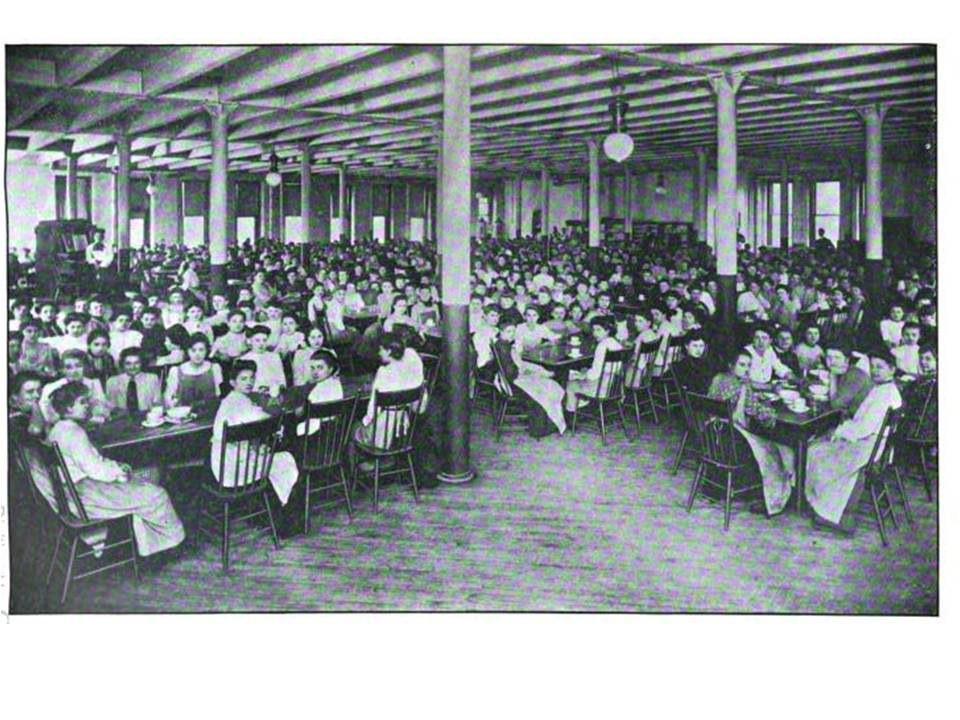
photograph of the dining hall at the Detroit Brown Brothers Branch factory
