= Robert Collis =

Irish doctor and writer (1900–1975)

- Born: William Robert Fitzgerald Collis; 16 February 1900; Killiney, County Dublin, Ireland
- Died: 27 May 1975 (aged 75)
- Education: Rugby School; Trinity College, Cambridge; Yale University
- Occupations: Doctor and writer
- Relatives: Maurice Collis (elder brother), John Stewart Collis (twin brother)

William Robert Fitzgerald Collis (16 February 1900 – 27 May 1975), was an Irish doctor specialising in paediatrics, a rugby international, and a writer. He was known as Robert Collis or W.R.F. Collis. As a doctor, he was commonly known as Dr. Bob Collis.

== Biography ==
=== Early life and education ===
Collis was born in Killiney, County Dublin, Ireland. His formal education began at Aravon School in Bray, County Wicklow, and continued in England, at Rugby School. After completing his secondary studies at Rugby, in 1918, Collis obtained a commission in the Irish Guards regiment of the British Army, but was demobilised after several months of training as Armistice brought the hostilities of the First World War to a close.

Collis matriculated at Trinity College, Cambridge, in 1919 to study medicine, spending 1921–1922 on an exchange scholarship at Yale University. He graduated BA (Cantab) in 1922 and continued clinical training at King's College Hospital Medical School, receiving his MB BChir in 1925 and MD in 1929.

He played rugby for Cambridge University R.U.F.C., including Blues in 1919 and 1920, and continued with King's College Hospital RFC. Collis won seven caps for Ireland in 1924, 1925, and 1926.

=== Medical career ===
After qualifying in medicine, Collis began his clinical career as a house physician at King's College Hospital, London, where he trained in general medicine, neurology, and children's medicine, before moving to Great Ormond Street Hospital for Sick Children in Bloomsbury, where he worked under Sir George Frederic Still, the "father of British paediatrics", serving as Still's last house physician prior to retirement. He qualified MCRP and in 1925, was awarded a Rockefeller Fellowship to undertake research in paediatrics at the Harriet Lane Children's Department of Johns Hopkins Hospital in Baltimore, Maryland. Upon return to Britain, Collis was appointed a research fellow at Great Ormond Street Hospital, where he carried out influential investigations into the aetiology of erythema nodosum.

In 1932, Collis moved back to Dublin to take over the practice and the Fitzwilliam Square residence of retiring paediatrician Dr. Brian Crichton. He was soon appointed director of the Department of Paediatrics at the Rotunda Hospital and physician to the National Children's Hospital, Harcourt Street. He was instrumental in the development of enhanced neonatal services at the Rotunda, particularly for premature babies.

Collis volunteered with the British Red Cross at the Bergen-Belsen concentration camp after its liberation by Allied troops in 1945. He facilitated the transport of five orphaned child survivors from Bergen-Belsen to Ireland in 1946, organising their placement and personally overseeing their ongoing convalescent care at Fairy Hill Hospital in Howth. Collis adopted two of the children, siblings Edit and Zoltan Zinn. While at Bergen-Belsen, he met Johanna "Han" Hogerzeil, a Dutch Red Cross volunteer, whom he later married after a divorce from his first wife, Phyllis Heron.

In 1948, Collis established the first dedicated Cerebral Palsy clinic in Dublin, and founded the charity organisation Cerebral Palsy Ireland, which is now Enable Ireland. One of Collis's influential paediatric patients was Christy Brown, a Dublin cerebral palsy patient referred to him for physiotherapy-oriented rehabilitative treatment by his sister-in-law, Dr. Eirene Collis, a London-based specialist in cerebral palsy. Brown became a notable author and artist. Collis proofread drafts of Brown's autobiography, My Left Foot, for which he wrote a foreword. Published in 1954, the book was later adapted into the widely acclaimed 1989 film, My Left Foot.

=== Family and personal life ===
Collis was born into a prominent Anglo-Irish family. The writer John Stewart Collis was his twin and Maurice Collis, writer and biographer, was his elder brother. He married Phyllis Heron, a native of Cornwall, in 1927. They had two sons and adopted and raised the Holocaust survivor siblings Edit and Zoltan Zinn together. After their divorce, Collis remarried in 1957, to Han Hogerzeil. He and Han moved to Ibadan, Nigeria; they also had two sons, one of whom died young.

== Works ==
He wrote the play Marrowbone Lane and an autobiography titled The Silver Fleece, both in 1939. The book Straight On (1947), with Han Hogerzeil, whom he later married, recounts the liberation of Belsen. Other books included The Ultimate Value (1951) about the refugee children, A Doctor's Nigeria (1960), Nigeria In Conflict (1970) and To Be a Pilgrim (1975).
