= Maurice Collis =

Irish administrator in British Burma

Maurice Stewart Collis

Magistrate of Rangoon
- In office 1929–1930

Personal details
- Born: 10 January 1889 Dublin, Ireland
- Died: 12 January 1973 (aged 84)
- Relatives: John Stewart Collis (brother); Robert Collis (brother)
- Education: University of Oxford
- Occupation: Administrator

Maurice Stewart Collis (10 January 1889 – 12 January 1973) was an administrator in Burma (Myanmar) when it was part of the British Empire, and afterwards a writer on Southeast Asia, China and other historical subjects.

== Life ==
He was born in Dublin, the son of an Irish solicitor, and went to Rugby School in 1903 and then in 1907 to the University of Oxford, where he studied history. He entered the Indian Civil Service in 1911 and was posted to Burma in 1912. He had postings at Sagaing and elsewhere. In 1917, the British army raised a Burmese brigade with which Collis went to Palestine, but he saw no action. In 1919, he went on leave and travelled in Europe. In the 1920s he was district commissioner in Arakan. In the 1920s he lived in Kyaukpyu. In 1929–1930, a period when relations between Burmese, Indians and British became particularly difficult, he was district magistrate in Rangoon. This period is narrated in his memoir Trials in Burma. He gives special attention to the political trial of Jatindra Mohan Sengupta, mayor of Calcutta, for sedition in impromptu speeches made during a brief visit to Rangoon in 1930; also to two criminal trials which became politically charged because they brought to light underlying attitudes of British merchants and army officers to Burmese people. Collis's judgements were (according to his own analysis) too independent to be pleasing to the then British Government of Burma, arousing the particular disapproval of his superior, Booth Gravely, Commissioner of the Pegu Division. After giving judgement in the last of these trials Collis was hastily moved to the post of Excise Commissioner. After returning to England in 1934, he wrote many books, including Siamese White and Foreign Mud, as well as art and literary criticism. At the age of 65 he turned his hand to painting.

His younger brothers were the writer John Stewart Collis and Robert Collis, a notable doctor and author; John and Robert were twins.

== Works ==
=== Autobiographies ===
- Trials in Burma (1930–31), Faber & Faber, 1938 (reissued 1953)
- The Journey Outward (1911–18), Faber & Faber, 1952
- Into Hidden Burma (1919–34), Faber & Faber, 1953
- The Journey Up: Reminiscences 1934-1968, Faber & Faber, 1970

=== Biographies ===
- Siamese White (about Samuel White and the Anglo-Siamese War of 1687), Faber & Faber, 1936 (revised 1951)
- The Grand Peregrination: Being the Life and Adventures of Fernão Mendes Pinto, Faber & Faber, London, 1949
- Marco Polo, Faber & Faber, 1950
- Cortés and Montezuma (about the Spanish conquest of Mexico), Faber & Faber, 1954
- Nancy Astor: An Informal Biography, Faber & Faber, 1960
- Raffles (Faber, London, 1966; about Stamford Raffles), Faber & Faber, 1966
- Somerville and Ross: A Biography (about Edith Somerville and Violet Martin/"Martin Ross"), Faber & Faber, 1968
- Stanley Spencer: A Biography (about the painter Stanley Spencer), Harvill Press, 1962

=== Histories ===
- The Great Within (Peking and the Forbidden City), Faber & Faber, 1941
- British Merchant Adventurers (from the "Britain in Pictures" series), William Collins, 1942
- The Land of the Great Image: Being Experiences of Friar Manrique in Arakan, Faber & Faber, 1943; New York: Alfred A. Knopf, 1943. Translated into Portuguese in 1944 (Na terra da Grande Imagem. Livraria Civilização. Porto).
- Foreign Mud: Being an Account of the Opium Imbroglio at Canton in the 1830s and the Anglo-Chinese War That Followed, Faber & Faber, 1946
- The First Holy One (about Confucius and his philosophy), Faber & Faber, 1948
- Last and First in Burma (1941–48), Faber & Faber, 1956
- The Hurling Time (England during the Fourteenth Century), Faber & Faber, 1958
- Wayfoong: The Hongkong and Shanghai Banking Corporation, Faber & Faber, 1965

=== Fiction ===
- She Was a Queen, Faber & Faber, 1937
- Sanda Mala, Carrick & Evans, 1940
- The Dark Door, Faber & Faber, 1940
- Quest for Sita, Faber & Faber, 1946
- The Mystery of Dead Lovers (with drawings by Cawthra Mulock), Faber & Faber, 1951
- The Three Gods, Smythe, 1970

=== Drama ===
- The Motherly and Auspicious: Being the Life of the Empress Dowager Tzu Hsi in the Form of a Drama, with an Introduction and Notes, Faber & Faber, 1943
- White of Mergen (illustrated by Feliks Topolski), Faber & Faber, 1945
- Lord of the Three Worlds, (with designs by Topolski), Faber & Faber, 1947

=== Other ===
- Lords of the Sunset: A Tour in the Shan States (Collis toured the Shan States in Northern Burma in the winter of 1937, meeting the various local rulers, attending a funeral, and following a murder trial), Faber & Faber, 1938
- Alva Paintings and Drawings, John Lane at the Bodley Head, 1942
- The Descent of the God, Faber & Faber, 1948
