= To the Ladies =

To the Ladies may refer to:

- To the Ladies (film), a 1923 American silent comedy film
- To the Ladies (album), a 1982 album by Johnny Griffin
- To the Ladies (play), a 1922 Broadway play by George S. Kaufman and Marc Connelly
