= The Wisdom Tooth =

1924 play by Marc Connelly

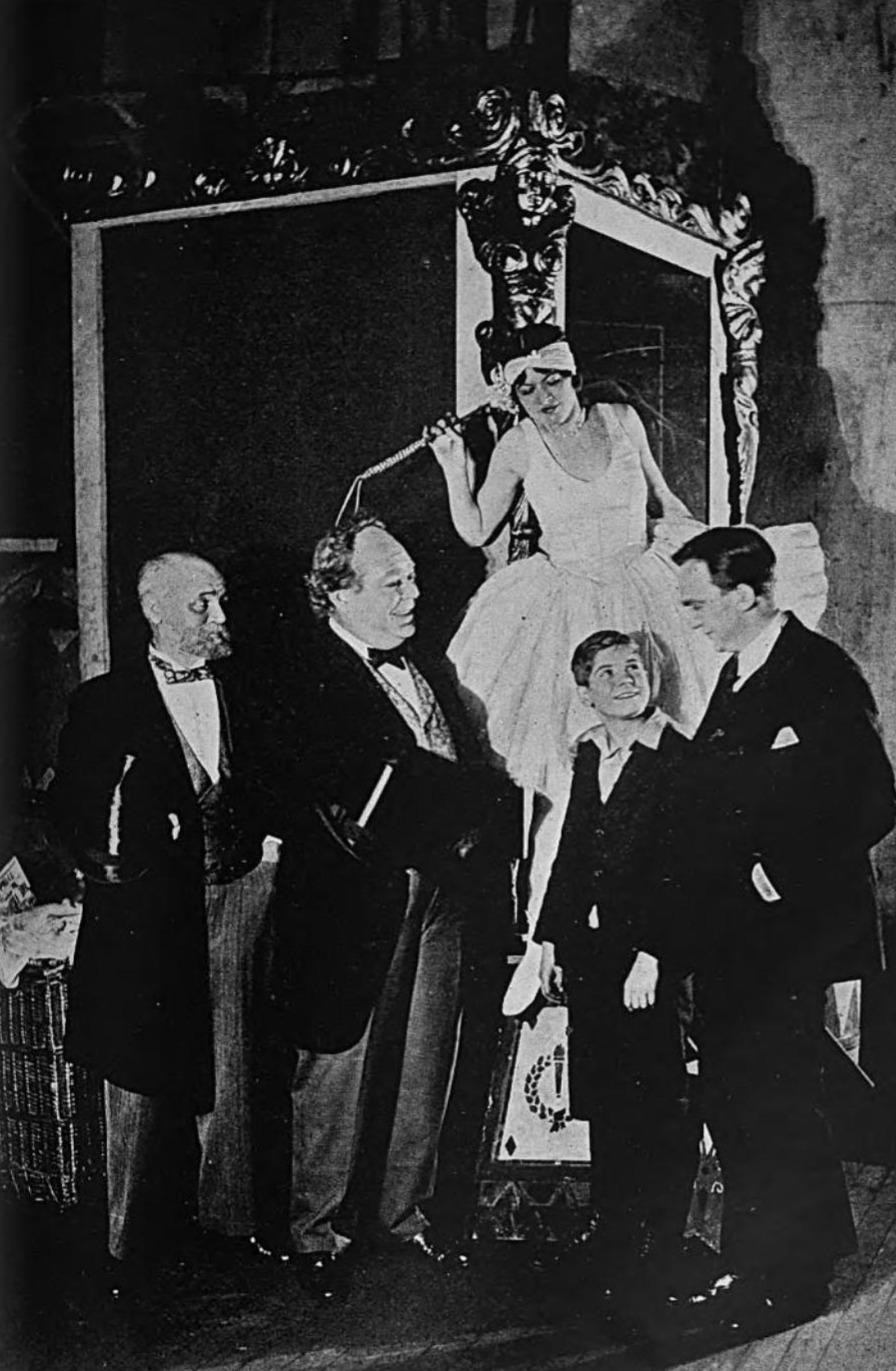
- Original language: English
- Written by: Marc Connelly
- Music by: Werner Janssen
- First publication: 1927
- Subject: Self rejuvenation
- Genre: Comedy
- Setting: Business office; dentist's waiting room; boarding house; old time circus

Premiere
- Date: February 15, 1926
- Place: Little Theatre
- Directed by: Winchell Smith
- Original run: 153 performances

The Wisdom Tooth is a 1924 play by Marc Connelly. It is a comedy in three acts and eight scenes, with five settings and a large cast. The action of the play takes place during a single day in the present, with some fantasy scenes of temporal uncertainty. The story concerns an Indiana farm boy who has lost his gumption in becoming a New York City senior accounts clerk, and how he found himself again. This was Connelly's first solo play after the breakup of his partnership with George S. Kaufman.

The play was first sold to Martin Beck, who produced two tryouts in April 1925, directed by David Burton, with settings by Woodman Thompson and original incidental music by Deems Taylor. Critical reaction was severe, and The Wisdom Tooth was shelved then sold to John Golden in November 1925. Golden retained Woodman Thompson's sets, but had Winchell Smith re-stage it, with new incidental music by Werner Janssen. Both productions starred Thomas Mitchell and Mary Philips. The revised production had a tryout at Washington, D.C. during January 1926, and another in Hartford, Connecticut during early February. It premiered on Broadway that same month, where it ran through June 1926, for 153 performances. Burns Mantle included The Wisdom Tooth among the top ten works for The Best Plays of 1925-26.

== Characters ==
Characters are listed in order of appearance within their scope. Many minor characters are omitted for clarity.

Lead

- Charley Bemis is 30, a cautious senior accounts clerk from Indiana at Porter & Company.
- Sally Field is 30, a newspaper writer, also a boarder at Mrs. Poole's, who likes Charley.

Supporting

- Mr. Porter is head of Porter & Company, a distinguished looking man.
- Mrs. Poole an elderly woman who runs the boarding house where Charley and Sally live.
- Farraday is a married boarder in Mrs. Poole's house, who baits Charley with nonsense.
- Lalita is a spirit embodying an idea Charley once had as a boy.
- Grandma and Grandpa Bemis, long deceased, raised Charley whom they called Skeeter.
- Skeeter is Charley's twelve-year-old self, summoned to spark him to take chances again.

Featured

- Sparrow is another senior accounts clerk at Porter & Company, a bit of a moocher.
- Mrs. Farraday
- Katie is Mrs. Poole's housekeeper. (Note: This character's name is also spelled "Katy" in the published play.)
- Kellog is a middle-aged businessman, who resides at Poole's boarding house.
- Fry is another middle-aged businessman living at Poole's.
- Barnum and Bailey (Note: They are in cast lists as A Circus Owner and His Partner.)
- Porky is a local tough kid, who doesn't believe in fairies.
- Everett is the local ne'er-do-well, working at the circus after a spell in jail.
- Mildred is 11, Everett's niece and Skeeter's girl.

== Synopsis ==
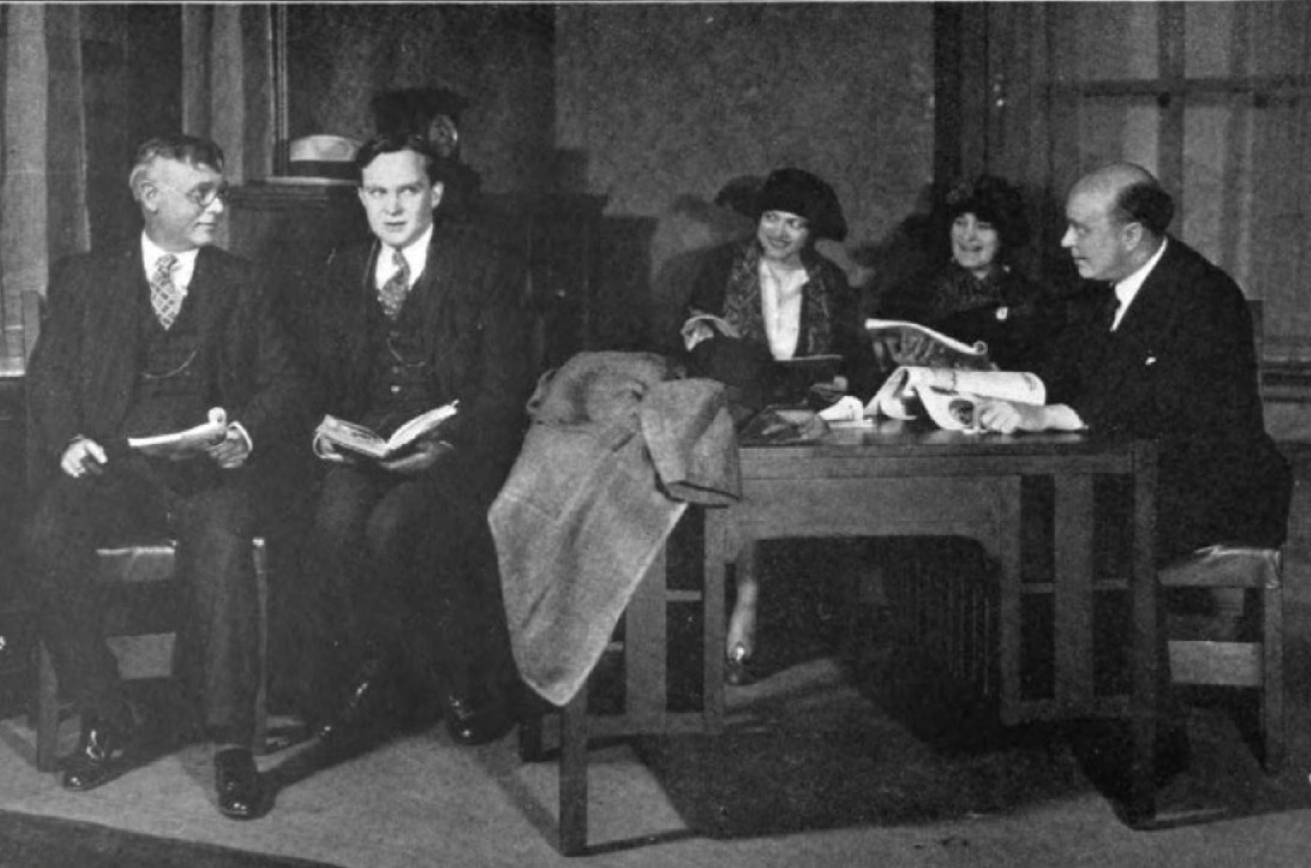

Act I (Scene 1: Men's Washroom at Porter & Company.) Charley banters with colleagues about his saving so much money and not marrying. He complains of an aching wisdom tooth, and gets a recommendation for a dentist from Sparrow. They all wonder why a bright pretty stenographer nicknamed the Duchess was dismissed suddenly. Charley vows to challenge their boss Mr. Porter about it, but goes quiet when he passes by, drawing his coworkers' derision. (Curtain)

Act I (Scene 2: Waiting room of Dentist's office. Later that afternoon.) Charley arrives for his appointment to find four people ahead of him, two men and two women. All the magazines are taken so he goes to a bookshelf and pulls down a volume of fairy tales. The two men tease him about his choice of reading matter; Charley tries to justify it, while the two women smile at his discomfiture. He eventually gives up and leaves without seeing the dentist. (Curtain)

Act I (Scene 3: By fireplace of Mrs. Poole's boarding house. That evening.) The various denizens of Mrs. Poole's make their entrances and exits. Sally and Charley sit out dinner because of his tooth. He has bought her a cribbage board, because she used to play it in college. Mrs. Poole is fond of Charley; he has lived there six years and never missed paying rent on time. Farraday discourages Sally from taking Charley seriously, because he lacks opinions of his own. He proceeds to demonstrate this by switching sides in an argument, and each time Charley goes along with Farraday's new opinion. Alone now, Sally tells Charley she likes him, but despairs of freeing the strong person she senses inside him. She calls him a "carbon-copy person" then leaves him in the room now lit only by the fire. He speaks into the fire, wishing his grandparents were there to convince others he was really someone to respect. He hears his long-dead grandma calling "Skeeter! Skeeter!" and answers "Here I am!" The double doors of the room open by themselves, filled with a blue light, as his grandparents enter wearing old-fashioned clothes. (Curtain)

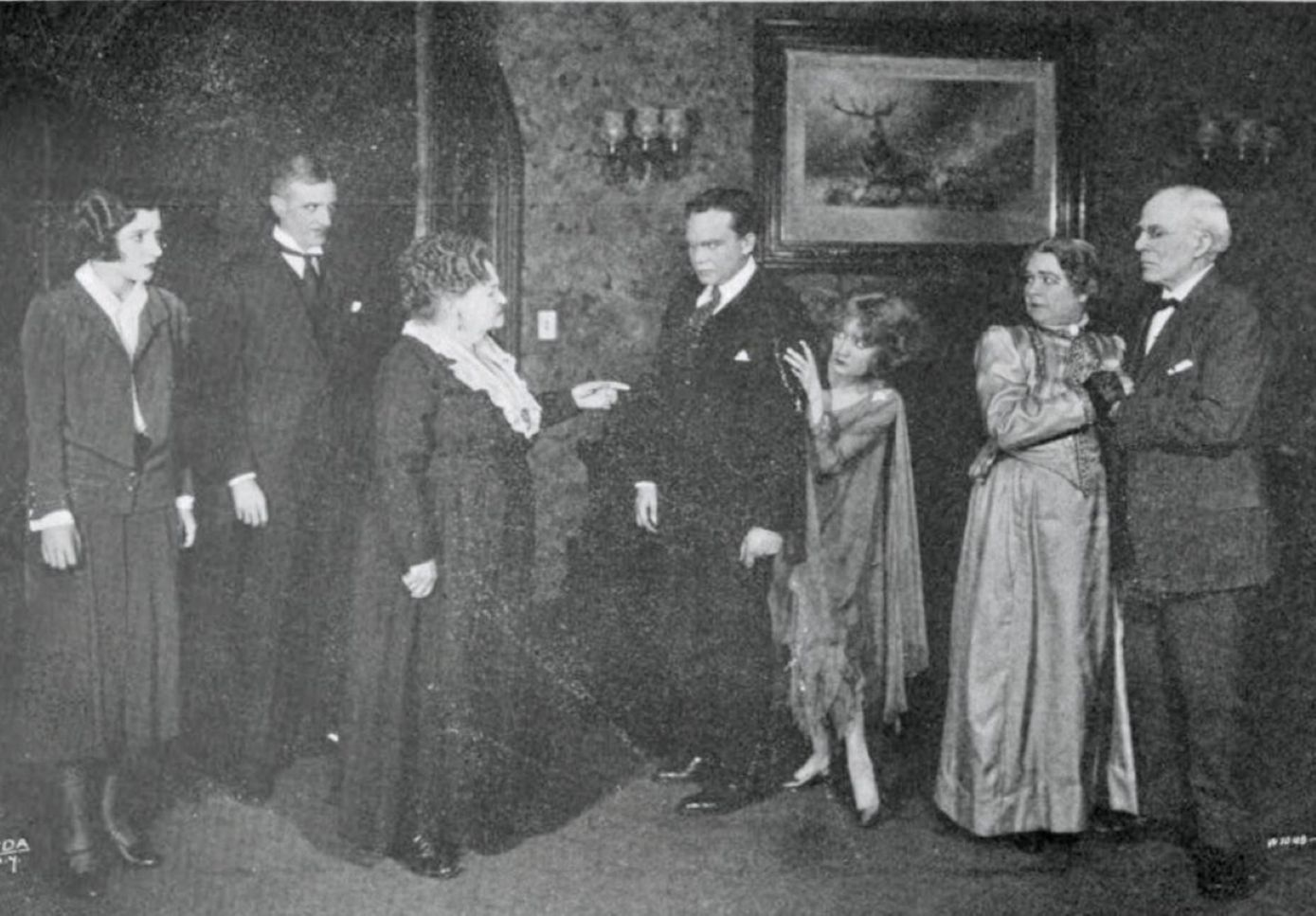

Act II (Scene 1: Same as Act I Scene 3. A moment later.) Charley greets his grandparents with relief, telling them he really needs their help. He, and other living people in this scene find nothing incongruous about their presence. The grandparents introduce Lalita, an immortal spirit; Charley and her remember each other from his boyhood. Charley explains the problem he is having with Sally. Summoned to the room by Charley, she is introduced to the grandparents and Lalita. The latter's attire is considered a bit outlandish, so Charley fetches Katie, while the grandparents tell Sally about Charley's deeds as a boy in Indiana, how he saved a horse from a barn fire and rescued a mule from a pit. Katie agrees to take Lalita to Sally's room for a change of dress. Farraday is called for by Sally to see the true Charlie, but he refuses to change his opinion of him. In a moment, he is proved right, when Mrs. Poole enters to scold Bemis about Lalita. She insists the spirit and the old folks leave her house, and Charlie does not stand up for them. At this, the grandparents and Lalita fail to recognize Charlie as Skeeter, the boy they used to know. They depart calling for him. Sally encourages Charly to go seek Skeeter too, to recapture his lost self. Charley starts out the door calling after his grandparents. (Curtain)

Act II (Scene 2: Blackdrop with only Charley's face lit up.) (Note: This scene is very short, and the two synopses in the published play omit it, but the body of the published text has it as a distinct numbered scene. It is not mentioned by first night reviewers, who described the play as having seven scenes, but its action was included by Burns Mantle for the condensed version of The Wisdom Tooth in The Best Plays of 1925-26.) Voices are heard, some from Charley's youth, others just fellow travelers on the mysterious road Lalita and his grandparents took. Charley tries to speak with the voices of his youth, reminding them of shared events. At mention of a circus, he recalls working to earn tickets for him and his grandparents. The circus voices and noises begin to predominate and music is heard. (Curtain)

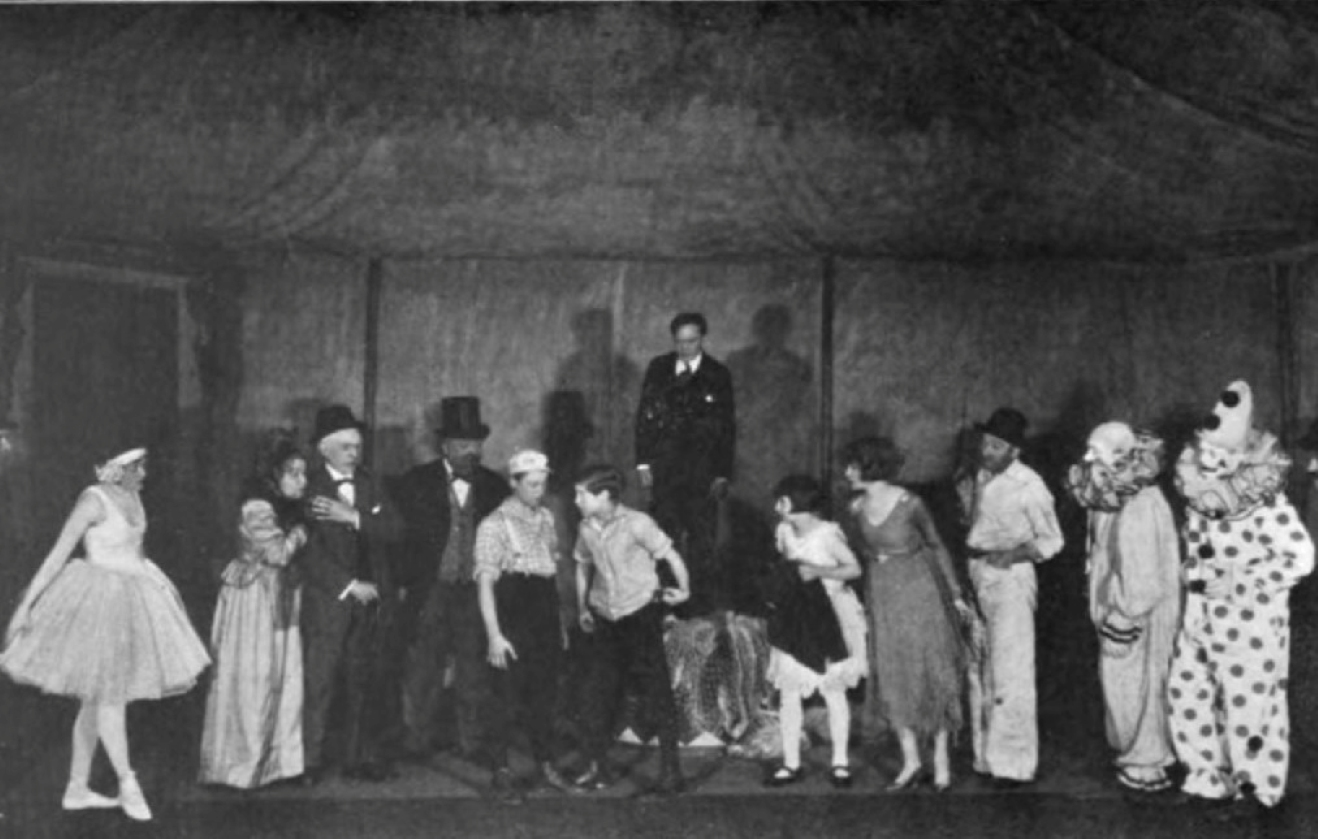

Act II (Scene 3: An old fashioned circus.) Charley finds himself under a big top, with circus performers and crew moving about. Grandpa and Grandma Bemis come in, happy that Charley, whom they once again recognize as Skeeter, provided tickets for them. Barnum and Bailey greet them and introduce the clowns and animal trainer. They spot Porky wriggling in under the canvas, but Barnum and Bailey allow him to enter. Charley sees Everett hauling water for the animals. Everett explains he took the job after his last sentence for drunkenness was done. Charley introduces Lalita as his girl, but Everett corrects him; your girl is my niece Mildred. She now appears, glad to have met up with Charley and delighted to meet Lalita. Porky challenges Mildred and Charley; he cannot see Lalita because he does not believe in fairies. The clowns join in the rough teasing, but all are put in their place when Skeeter appears. Though smaller than Porky, he forces him to back down and apologize. Charley implores Skeeter to help him recover his courage. Skeeter agrees to help Charley, for a little while. (Curtain)

Act II (Scene 4: Mr. Porter's office) Skeeter takes Charley to the present time, but the haziness of light signals another fantasy scene. Sparrow brings accounts for Mr. Porter, who asks for Charley. Skeeter is ignored by Sparrow and Mr. Porter, who both welcome Charley. The latter immediately announces his resignation, explaining its the only way he can challenge his big boss about the dismissal of the Duchess. After some verbal skirmishing, Mr. Porter reveals the Duchess was habitually late for work, incompetent, and overly familiar. He then asks Charley to reconsider his resignation, and he agrees to stay. Skeeter says he is leaving now to return to Grandma and Grandpa. Charley wants him to stay and help bolster his courage, but Skeeter is adamant he is not going to babysit Charley. He will, however, be there if Charley really needs him. They shake hands and part, with Charley musing "Gee, I was a swell kid". (Curtain)

Act III (Same as Act I Scene 3. Same evening, 10:30 pm.) Charley finds himself back in front of the fire at Mrs. Poole's. She brings in Sparrow, who has come to borrow some money for taking a young lady home by taxi cab. Kellog and Fry join them for a brief discussion about business and the French war debt. Charley gradually comes to self-realization as he listens to their opinions. When Faraday and his wife return from the cinema, Charley reminds them of his recommending the film. Despite the late hour, he telephones Porter at home and challenges him over the dismissed Duchess. Sally has come into the room and hears the call. Mr. Porter fires Charley over the phone for impudence. Charley tells Sally he does not care, he said what he meant to say. Sally is delighted, and signals her renewed interest in Charley by agreeing to teach him to play cribbage. (Curtain)

== Original production ==
=== Background ===
“Mr. Kaufman's play is mined from the rich vein of observant wit and satire that are his most distinguishable gifts. Mr. Connelly's fantasy is born of a somewhat deeper sentimental urge and an evident desire to cleave more closely to a definite theme.”
– Burns Mantle on their first solo plays

Marc Connelly and George S. Kaufman were a playwriting team starting with Dulcy in 1920, followed by To the Ladies and Merton of the Movies (1922), Helen of Troy, New York (1923), and Beggar on Horseback (1924). Howard Teichmann wrote that "As collaborating playwrights, Connelly was a whimsical optimist and Kaufmann was the cynical pessimist." Teichmann said Kaufman complained that "Connelly was constantly late for work, often missing entire sessions". Connelly wrote many years later that Kaufman was not enthusiastic about his idea for The Wisdom Tooth, while he did not care for Kaufman's proposed satire, The Butter and Egg Man, so they went their own ways as playwrights while remaining lifelong friends. Connelly said his inspiration for The Wisdom Tooth came from watching Thomas Mitchell in a revival of The Playboy of the Western World.

Martin Beck purchased The Wisdom Tooth by early February 1925, with Thomas Mitchell and Mary Philips cast for the leads later that month. Helen Chandler was added to the cast in early March 1925, while David Burton would direct. Sets were designed by Woodman Thompson and Deems Taylor composed incidental music.

=== First tryouts ===
Martin Beck scheduled a week-long tryout for The Wisdom Tooth starting April 13, 1925 at Baltimore's Ford's Theatre, to be followed by another at Nixon's Apollo Theatre in Atlantic City. Connelly had misgivings about the play's readiness, but Beck wanted it to have a summer season at the New Jersey ocean resorts. The Baltimore reviewer noted the first night curtain was delayed 25 minutes, and said The Wisdom Tooth, aside from Thomas Mitchell's performance, "failed grievously to live up to its promises".

E. F. Smith in Atlantic City described a very different play from what would eventually appear on Broadway, and said there was "no orchestra, except for elfin music behind the scenes". Smith said the play was ambitious but left the audience confused as to what was real or a dream. George M. Cohan caught the Atlantic City performance and suggested to Connelly it could be saved if "you think the story out more clearly". Connelly confessed to Martin Beck he was momentarily out of ideas, and so the production was shut down and the sets put into storage.

=== Cast ===
Principal cast from the Washington, D.C. and Hartford tryouts through the Broadway run. Some listed doubled up in minor roles.
Role	Actor	Dates	Notes and sources
Charles Bemis	Thomas Mitchell	Jan 18, 1926 - Jun 29, 1926	
Sally Field	Mary Philips	Jan 18, 1926 - Jun 29, 1926	
Mr. Porter	Malcolm Williams	Jan 18, 1926 - Jun 29, 1926	
Mrs. Poole	Kate Mayhew	Jan 18, 1926 - Jun 29, 1926	Mayhew, who started on stage at age four, was 71 when she took this role.
Farraday	Richard Carlyle	Jan 18, 1926 - Feb 06, 1926	
Farraday	Charles Laite	Feb 15, 1926 - Jun 29, 1926	
Lalita	Helen Chandler	Jan 18, 1926 - Feb 06, 1926	
Lalita	Patricia Barclay	Feb 15, 1926 - Jun 29, 1926	
Grandpa Bemis	Mark Sullivan	Jan 18, 1926 - Jun 29, 1926	
Grandma Bemis	Marion Ballou	Jan 18, 1926 - Jun 29, 1926	
Skeeter	Edwin Philips	Jan 18, 1926 - Jun 29, 1926	At fourteen, he had been on Broadway for two years and would perform there for another thirty.
Sparrow	William Foran	Jan 18, 1926 - Jun 29, 1926	
Mrs. Farraday	Madeline Barr	Jan 18, 1926 - Jun 29, 1926	
Katie	Ellenor Kennedy	Jan 18, 1926 - Jun 29, 1926	
Fry	Harold Ross	Jan 18, 1926 - Feb 06, 1926	
Fry	Robert Lawlor	Feb 18, 1926 - Jun 29, 1926	
Kellog	Robert C. Benchford	Jan 18, 1926 - Feb 06, 1926	
Kellog	Hugh O'Connell	Feb 15, 1926 - Jun 29, 1926	
Barnum	Jefferson Lloyd	Jan 18, 1926 - Jun 29, 1926	
Bailey	J. L. Gonnick	Jan 18, 1926 - Feb 06, 1926	
Bailey	William Wadsworth	Feb 15, 1926 - Jun 29, 1926	
Porky	Eddie Quinn	Jan 18, 1926 - Jun 29, 1926	
Everett	Hugh O'Connell	Jan 18, 1926 - Jun 29, 1926	This was O'Connell's original role during tryouts; for Broadway he doubled up as Kellog.
Mildred	Lenora Philips	Jan 18, 1926 - Jun 29, 1926	

=== Revised work and later tryouts ===
Connelly took several months to revise The Wisdom Tooth, losing the patronage of Martin Beck for having worked on another project in the meantime. Beck allowed the sets and costumes to be reused by any new buyer of the play for 20% of the profits. John Golden purchased the play in November 1925, and it was reported that writer Bertram Bloch was helping Marc Connelly with revisions. Golden assigned Winchell Smith to restage The Wisdom Tooth, and put it into rehearsals during January 1926.

The revised play had its first tryout on January 18, 1926, at the National Theatre in Washington, D.C. Critic John J. Daly said the performance went off without a hitch. He compared the play to a mix of Peter Pan and Dr Jekyll and Mr Hyde on the surface, but concluded that it was an in-depth analysis of Charley Bemis, this character predominating over all others. The Wisdom Tooth had another tryout starting February 2, 1926, at Parsons Theatre in Hartford, Connecticut. The local reviewer felt the play was largely an undramatic retelling of a dream and "there is nothing much more of a bore than having to hear about a dream". They praised Thomas Mitchell's acting, and that of Malcolm Williams, Edwin Philips, Marion Ballou and Mark Sullivan, but noted Mary Philips had little to do as female lead, while the incidental music did not help the play much.

=== Broadway premiere and reception ===
Two weeks after the last tryout, The Wisdom Tooth had its Broadway premiere on February 15, 1926, at the Little Theatre. Reviews showed five featured players had been replaced since Washington, D.C., some by other cast members doubling up a part. The Brooklyn Daily Times reviewer said it was a success, "a play of genuine humor and also some sincere drama", while the apparent fantasy covered "a realistic portrait of a clerk in search of his character." Burns Mantle said the play was entertaining though not stirring and had one good idea, the subsuming of individual character in the metropolis. He praised the main actors, but suggested scene changes were encountering problems with the Little Theater's revolving stage.

Arthur Pollock judged The Wisdom Tooth to be "kindly, warming and delightful", though he thought Connelly's affection for his characters masked the thinness of the play's idea. Brooks Atkinson also reported some trouble with first night stage mechanics, but was positive about Connelly's writing, which just skirted sentimentality. He was most enthusiastic about the performance of Thomas Mitchell, who he felt filled up the few gaps in Charley's character left by the playwright. Stark Young felt that Connelly allowed a chance to slip past of developing the play's idea into something more profound. Alone among critics, he was not impressed by Thomas Mitchell's performance, saying he "defeats criticism by identifying himself with the character."

=== Broadway closing ===
The Wisdom Tooth closed at the Little Theatre on Saturday, June 26, 1926, after 153 performances. (Note: Burns Mantle reported 139 performances as of Tuesday, June 15, 1926, with six more performances for the rest of that week, and another eight for the week following, until closing on June 26, 1926.) Burns Mantle included The Wisdom Tooth among the top ten plays of the season in The Best Plays of 1925-26.

== Bibliography ==
- Burns Mantle (ed). The Best Plays of 1925-26 And The Year Book Of The Drama In America. Dodd, Mead and Company, 1926.
- Marc Connelly. The Wisdom Tooth: A Fantastic Comedy in Three Acts. Samuel French, 1927.
- Marc Connelly. Voices Offstage: A Book of Memoirs. Holt, Rinehart & Winston, Inc, 1968.
- Howard Teichmann. George S. Kaufman: An Intimate Portrait. Atheneum, 1972.
