= Kate Mayhew =

American actress

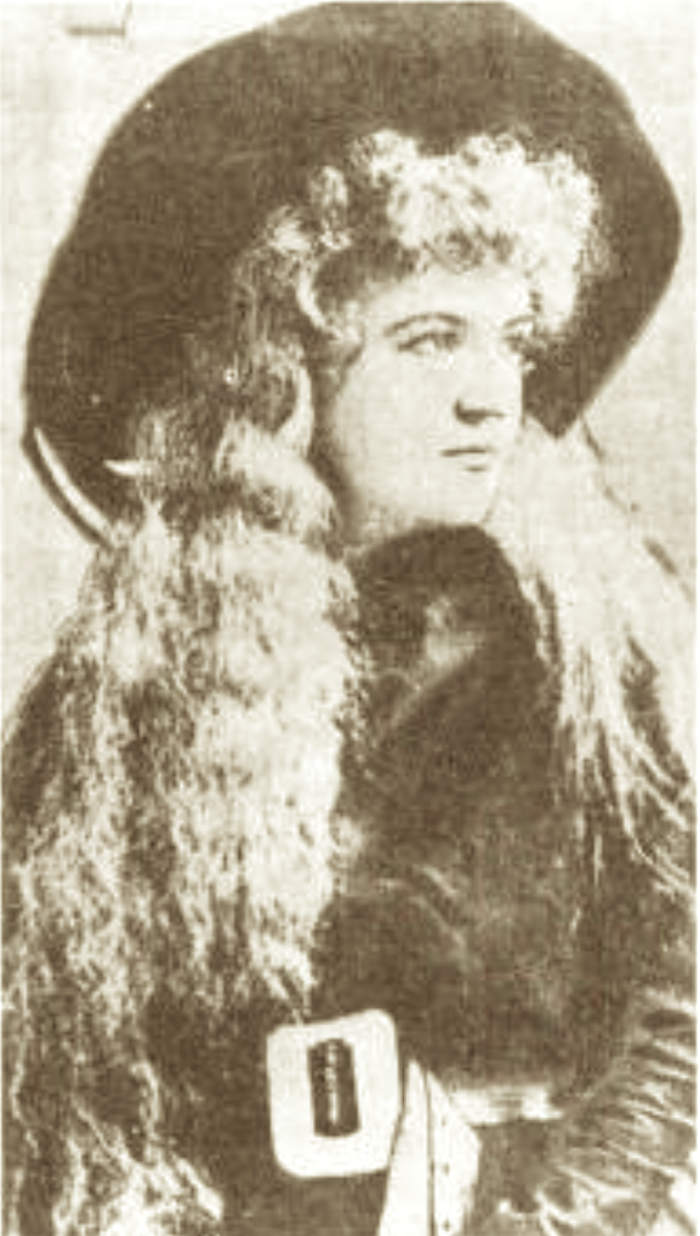
- Kate Mayhew as M'liss in c. 1878
- Born: September 2, 1853; Indianapolis, Indiana
- Died: May 16, 1944 (aged 90); New York
- Occupation: Actress
- Years active: 1870s–1936

Kate Mayhew (September 2, 1853 – June 16, 1944), also known as Katie Mayhew and Kate Mayhew Widmer, was an American stage and radio actress.

== Biography ==
She first performed on stage as a four-year-old child at the Metropolitan Opera House in Indianapolis, and her first New York performance was at Niblo's Garden Theatre in 1873.

Mayhew became involved in producing plays, and owned the rights to M'Liss written by Clay M. Greene (adapted from a story by Bret Harte), in the 1870s. Mayhew performed the title role herself at the Grand Opera House in New York in September 1878, however, a legal battle over rights to the play eventually saw Annie Pixley take up the role to critical acclaim.

She performed in productions of Shakespeare, playing the roles of Juliet's Mother in Romeo and Juliet, and Gertrude, Queen of Denmark, in Hamlet.

In the 1890s, she appeared in Oriental parts.

Mayhew appeared on Broadway in supporting roles, including a long stint in The Wisdom Tooth by Marc Connelly during 1925–1926. She made films, and also voiced characters for radio programmes.

Mayhew donated playbills and other theatre ephemera to the New York Public Library in 1930. One of her last Broadway appearances was in the 1934 stage production of The Farmer Takes a Wife with Henry Fonda and June Walker.

She was born in Indianapolis, Indiana and died in New York aged 90.

== Selected filmography ==
- Tongues of Flame (1924)
