= Beggar on Horseback (film) =

1925 film by James Cruze

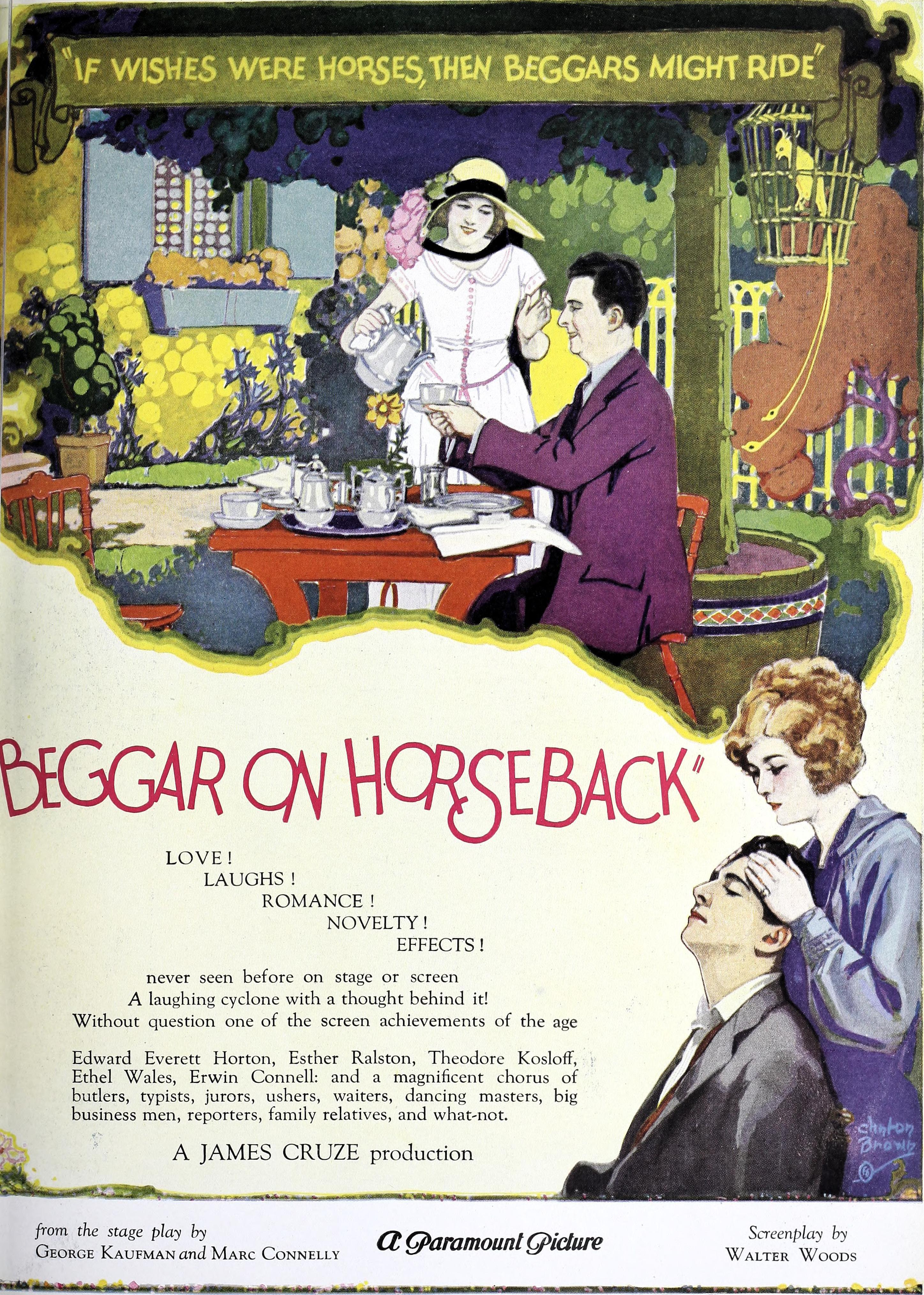
- Contemporary advertisement
- Directed by: James Cruze
- Screenplay by: Walter Woods
- Produced by: Jesse L. Lasky; Adolph Zukor
- Starring: Edward Everett Horton; Esther Ralston; Erwin Connelly; Gertrude Short; Ethel Wales; Theodore Kosloff; Betty Compson
- Cinematography: Karl Brown
- Music by: Hugo Riesenfeld
- Production company: Famous Players–Lasky Corporation
- Distributed by: Paramount Pictures
- Release date: August 24, 1925
- Running time: 70 minutes
- Country: United States
- Language: Silent (English intertitles)

Excerpt from the film

Beggar on Horseback is 1925 American surreal silent comedy film based upon the 1924 play Beggar on Horseback written by Marc Connelly and George S. Kaufman. It was adapted for the screen by Walter Woods and directed by James Cruze. It stars Edward Everett Horton, Esther Ralston, Erwin Connelly, Gertrude Short, Ethel Wales, Theodore Kosloff, and Betty Compson. It was released on August 24, 1925, by Paramount Pictures.

== Plot ==
As described in a film magazine review, a young idealistic jazz composer is on the verge of a nervous breakdown, and feels that he cannot continue a relationship with a sympathetic young woman because of a lack of funds. He is considering marrying a rich young woman who worships jazz, and falls asleep and dreams a horrible nightmare of his life as her husband. In this fantasy dream, he kills those who oppress him. He awakens and comes to appreciate the sympathetic young woman and seeks happiness with her. His publishers award him with royalties for his music compositions.

== Cast ==
- Edward Everett Horton as Neil McRae
- Esther Ralston as Cynthia Mason
- Erwin Connelly as Mr. Cady
- Gertrude Short as Gladys Cady
- Ethel Wales as Mrs. Cady
- Theodore Kosloff as Prince in Pantomime
- Betty Compson as Princess in Pantomime
- James Mason as Homer Cady
- Frederick Sullivan as Dr. Rice

== Preservation ==
An incomplete 35mm nitrate print of Beggar on Horseback is held by the Library of Congress.
