= The Campbell Playhouse =

The Campbell Playhouse may refer to:

- The Campbell Playhouse (radio series), old-time radio program starring Orson Welles
- The Campbell Playhouse (TV series), 1950s television series

== See also ==
- The Mercury Theatre on the Air, old-time radio program continued as The Campbell Playhouse
