= Gary Simpson =

Gary Simpson may refer to:

- Gary Simpson (footballer, born 1959), English former footballer; forward for Chesterfield and Chester City amongst others
- Gary Simpson (footballer, born 1961), English former footballer and manager; midfielder for Boston United, Stafford Rangers and Arnold Town amongst others
- Garry Simpson (1914–2011), American director, writer and producer
- F. Gary Simpson, American politician
