= Sham (play) =

Play by Frank G. Tompkins

Sham is a 1920 one-act stage play by Frank G. Tompkins. Described as A Social Satire, it was about a thief who is caught robbing a couple's home.

== Plot ==
Consisting of four characters, the comedy is set in a room of a house in a wealthy area. A cultured thief is attempting to rob the house, after he has stolen fine art from other houses in the area, but he finds the objects in the house are of poor quality. The owners of the house, Clara and Charles, come home unexpectedly after supposedly being at the theatre (they were actually at a movie). The thief informs them that, if he does not steal something from them, they will be disgraced as people find out their home contains no real fine works.

== Television adaptations ==
The play was adapted various times for early television. Three of these adaptations are documented.

A version aired live on 28 January 1945 on New York City station WABD, later part of the DuMont Television Network. Featuring Frieda Inescort, Melville Cooper, Harvey Stephens, and Charles Williams,

A version aired 7 February 1946 on Chicago station WBKB. Directed by Beulah Zachary, it featured Betty Babbock, Sid Breese and Joe Wilson. Reviewing the program, Billboard magazine said the acting was "not of top caliber" but felt the direction was good, also commenting on the "excellent camera angles". This version aired live, and is also lost.

A version aired 13 December 1948 on NBC's live anthology series Chevrolet on Broadway. Featuring Edward Everett Horton, Natalie Schafer, and Howard St. John, it aired live and was probably kinescoped, but it is not known if the kinescope recording still exists.
