= Martha Lorber =

American dancer, actress, singer, model and Ziegfeld Girl

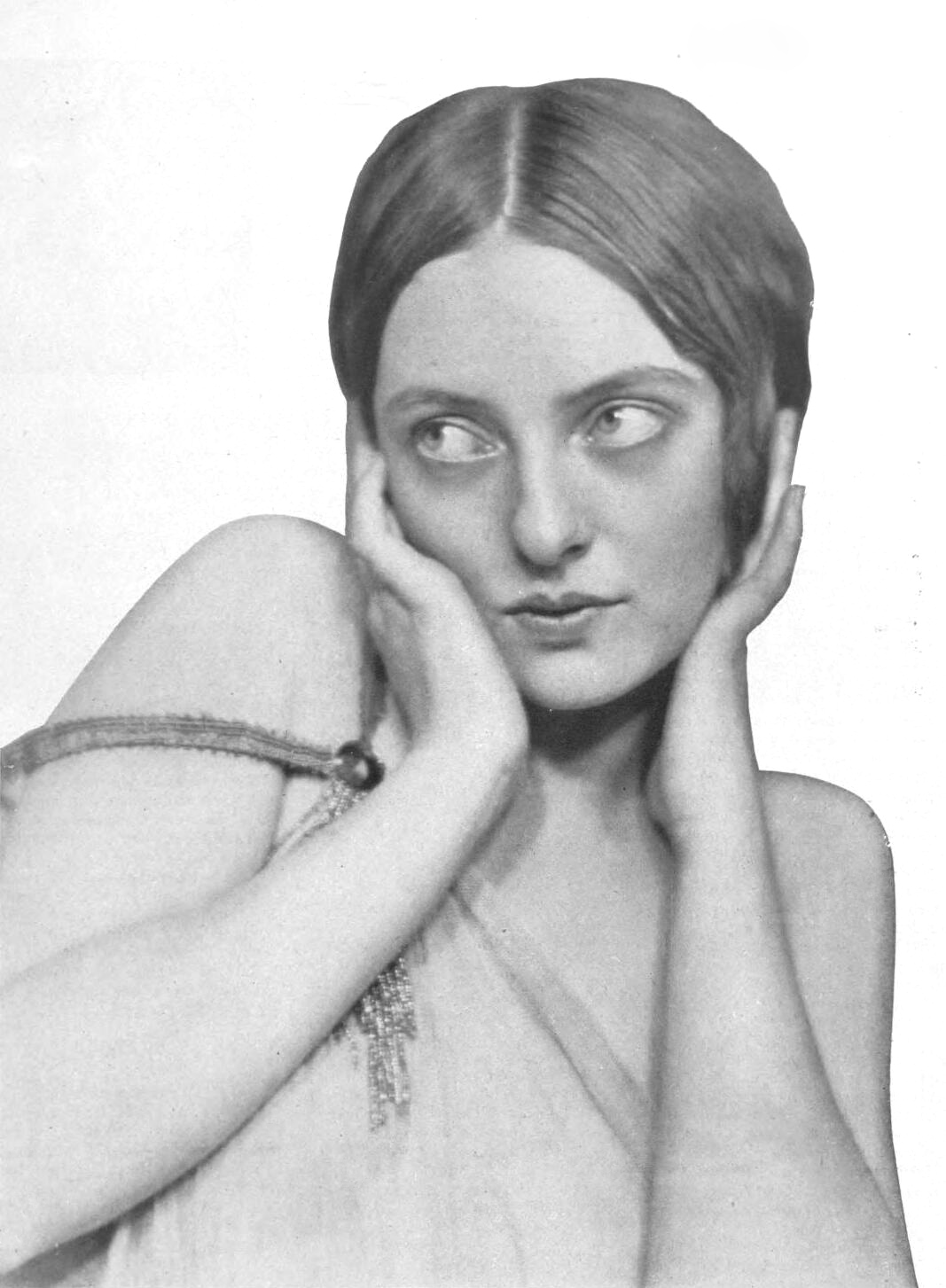
- Martha Lorber as photographed by Nickolas Muray, from a 1922 publication.
- Born: June 11, 1900; Manhattan, New York City, New York, U.S.
- Died: July 2, 1983 (aged 83); Lebanon Township, New Jersey, U.S.
- Occupations: Dancer, actress, model, singer

Martha Caroline Theresa Lorber (June 11, 1900 – July 2, 1983) was an American dancer, actress, singer, model, and Ziegfeld Girl.

== Early life ==
Martha Caroline Theresa Lorber was born in New York City, to Frederick, a waiter, and Marie Lorber (née Westfeldt), who were both German immigrants. She graduated from Girls' High School in Brooklyn. She studied dance with Alexis Kosloff, Ekaterina Galanta, and Michel Fokine.

== Career ==
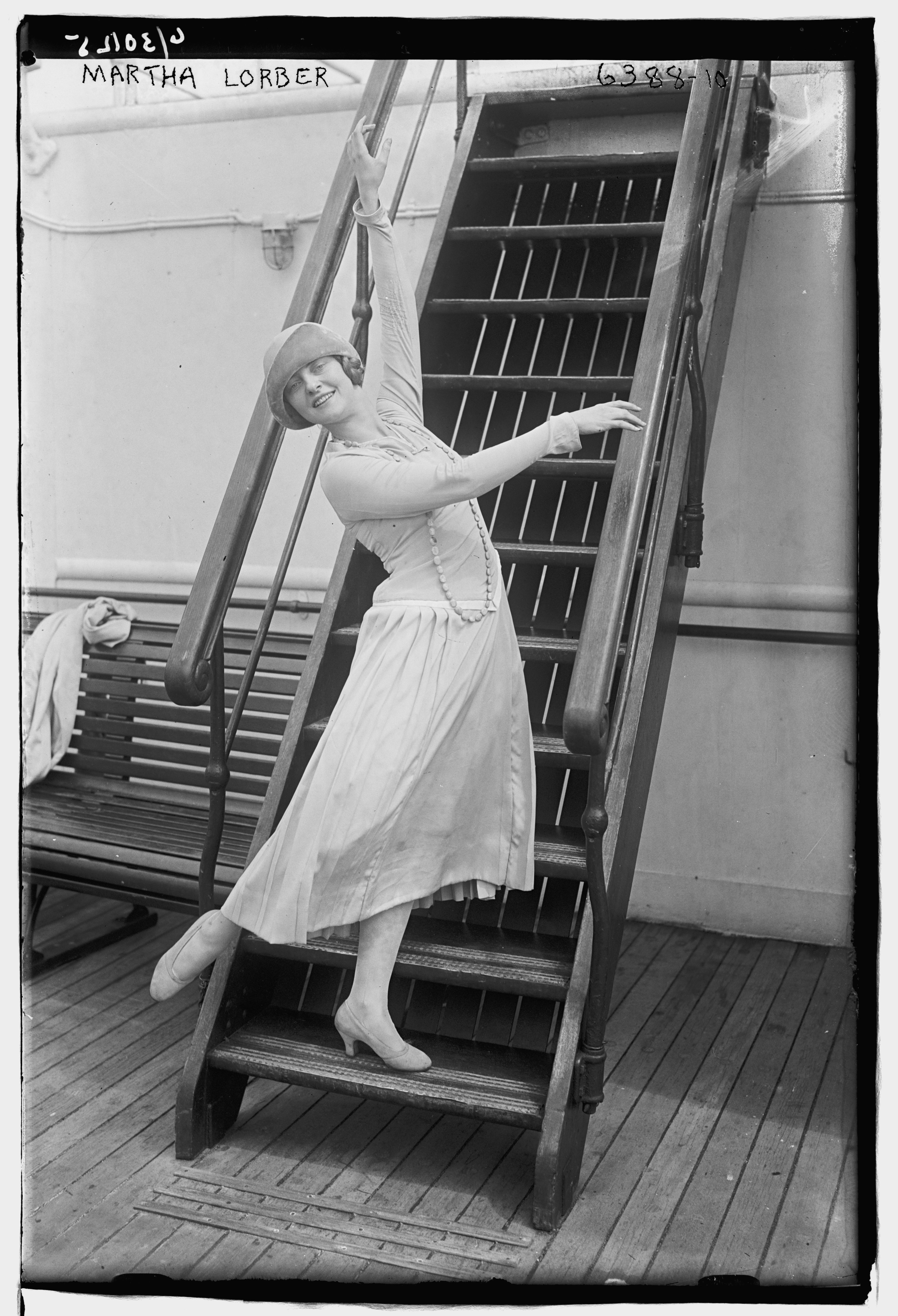
Martha Lorber in the 1920s, from the George Grantham Bain collection, Library of Congress.

Martha Lorber's Broadway career began when she was still in her teens, and included roles in Over the Top (1917–1918), Mecca (1920–1921), Tangerine (1922), Ziegfeld Follies of 1922, Ziegfeld Follies of 1923, Ziegfeld Follies of 1924, Mozart (1926), and Three Little Girls (1930). In the Ziegfeld Follies she played opposite W. C. Fields in some sketches, showing some comedic talent. She played a lead role in Ferenc Molnár's The Play's the Thing, in Baltimore in 1928. In 1929, she was in London, playing in Little Accident.

In 1930 she broke away from musicals with a dramatic part in the Zoe Akins drama The Greeks Had a Name for It. She starred in another drama the following year, Torch Song (1931), in Canada. In 1933, she was featured in two roles in another musical, The Red Robin, in Chicago. In 1934 she was in True to the Marines in Locust Valley.

In 1941, she toured in a one-woman show, Songs in Action. In 1951, she was hired by the U. S. State Department for a cultural relations position.

Lorber was also a model, posing for works by photographers Edward Steichen, Nickolas Muray, and Arnold Genthe, pin-up artist Alberto Vargas, and sculptor Harriet Whitney Frishmuth, among others.

== Personal life ==
Martha Lorber died at her home in Lebanon Township, New Jersey, in 1983, aged 83 years.
