= I Cover Times Square =

American TV newspaper and crime drama series (1950–1951)

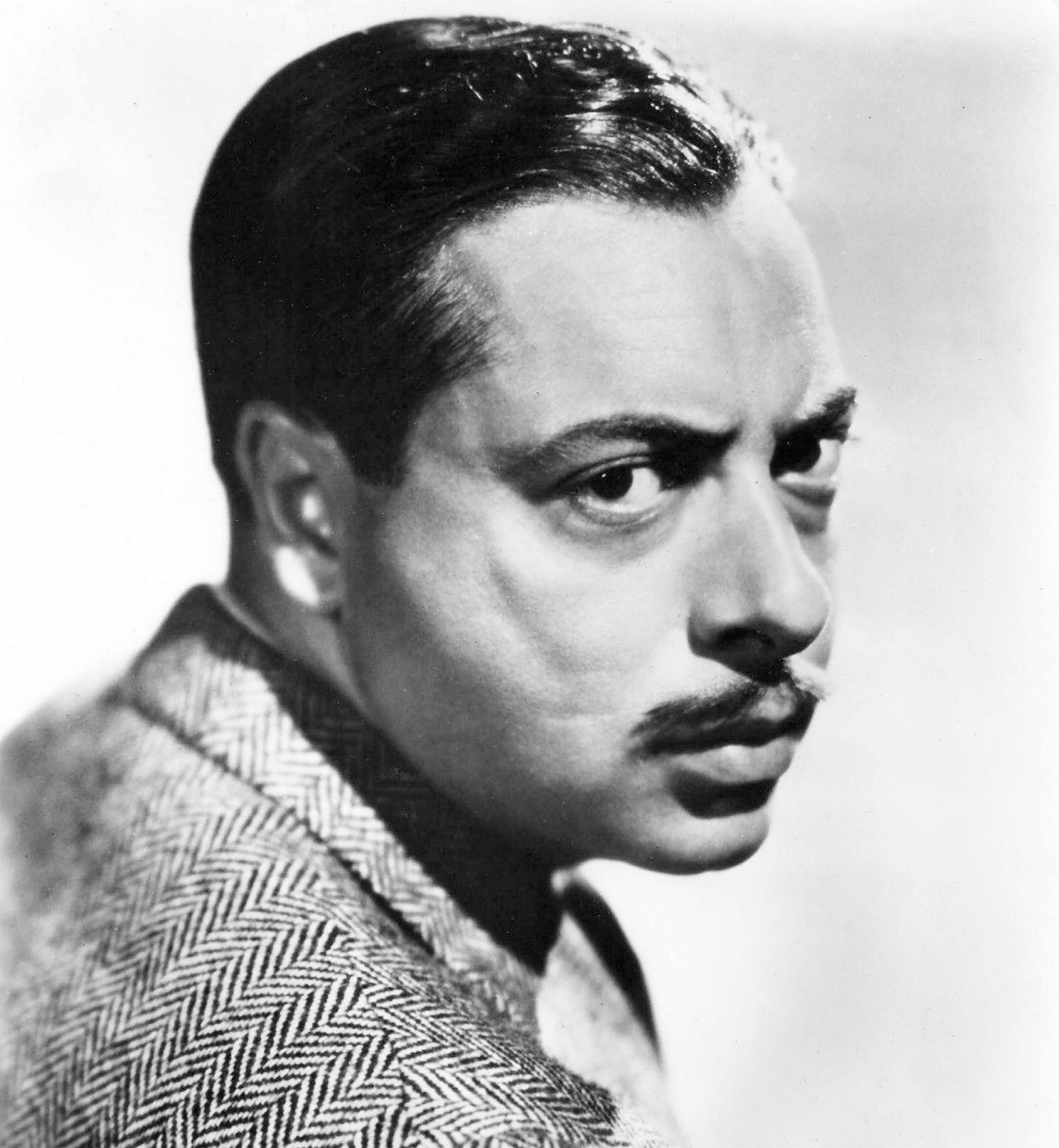
- Harold Huber starred in I Cover Times Square
- Country of origin: United States
- Original language: English

Original release
- Network: ABC
- Release: October 5, 1950 – October 13, 1951

I Cover Times Square is an American television newspaper drama and crime show that was broadcast in prime time on ABC from October 5, 1950, through January 11, 1951. A subsequent shift to daytime on Saturdays extended the program through October 13, 1951.

== Premise ==
Harold Huber portrayed Johnny Warren, a "crusading Broadway columnist" and radio commentator. Warren covered "the seamy side of show business", working from Times Square, where he usually hung out around a newspaper stand that carried papers from other cities. Warren described the Times Square setting as the "mad midway — the crazy carnival — the jittery jungle".

== Production ==
A pilot (also titled "I Cover Times Square") was broadcast as the December 26, 1949, episode of The Chevrolet Tele-Theatre.

Huber was the producer of I Cover Times Square. Murray Burnett and Ted Post were the directors. Air Wick was the sponsor. The program originated from WJZ-TV. It was initially broadcast on Thursdays from 10 to 10:30 p.m. Eastern Time. In April 1951 it returned to the air on Saturdays from 12:30 to 1 p.m. E. T. On May 5, 1951, Faith Baldwin Romance Theatre began sharing that time slot, with the two programs aired on alternate weeks. The show's final broadcast occurred on October 13, 1951.

Huber wore a toupee in the series — a situation that led to what newspaper columnist Dorothy Kilgallen called "the funniest hassle in the history of television". Huber wanted ABC to pay for the $75 hairpiece, saying that it should be considered a prop for the show. The network thought of it as part of Huber's personal wardrobe and said that he should pay for it.

== Critical response ==
A review in the trade publication Variety indicated that the show's premise had good potential for success but said that the premiere episode showed that "the series will require considerable shaking down if it's to capitalize on its advantages enough to attract an audience." The review said that the episode's first half depended too much on dialog, and that additional visual activity in the second half came too late. It added, "Background music was absent when it was needed most and was too loud when it did come in." The review said that Huber's acting was "okay" and the "supporting cast was competent".
