= One Got Fat =

1963 bike safety film

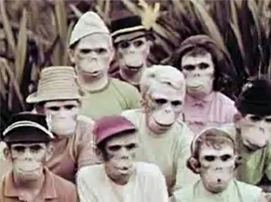
- The Kids
- Directed by: Dale Jennings
- Written by: Dale Jennings
- Narrated by: Edward Everett Horton
- Cinematography: Max Hutto
- Production company: Interlude Films
- Release date: December 1, 1963
- Running time: 15 min
- Country: United States
- Language: English

One Got Fat is a 1963 American short film about bicycle safety. It is written and directed by The Cowboys author Dale Jennings and narrated by F-Troop and Fractured Fairy Tales star Edward Everett Horton.

== Plot ==
In the film, ten children, nine of whom have monkey faces, hats and tails, plan on going to the park for a picnic. They all ride there on their eight bikes together on the nine-block journey (two did not have bikes; one's bicycle was stolen and who instead had to run to keep up with his friends, and the other was so obese that he broke his bicycle); seeing that one of their friends has a basket, they decide to have him carry all of their lunches to the park. Each one of the monkeys has a character flaw, and each disobeys a specific rule that prevents them from reaching the park. At each block, one of the monkeys is eliminated from the group because of the consequences of their disobedience—usually by way of a collision. In the end, only one of the friends (who not only followed all the bike safety rules, but is also a normal human, whose face is not shown until the very end) makes it to the park and, because he was the one with the basket, and because "he's no monkey", gets all of his friends' food to himself, even though he doesn't want it all. Thus, as the title says, "One got fat!" Three of the monkeys are seen in hospital beds.

In contrast to other social guidance films, One Got Fat is a black comedy.

== Characters ==
Each character represents a different rule of the road the character does not obey, along with a more general sin or vice the character has that prevents him or her from doing so. (Four of the nine sins correspond to four of the seven deadly sins.)

1. Rooty-Toot ("Rooty") Jasperson
  - Make Signals
  - Sin: Arrogance
  - Demise: Turned left without stopping, signaling or looking, directly into ongoing traffic
2. Tinkerbell ("Tink") McDillinfiddy
  - Watch Signs
  - Sin: Forgetfulness
  - Demise: Ignores a stop sign, resulting in being hit by a large truck
3. Phillip ("Floog") Floogle
  - Keep Right
  - Sin: Boredom
  - Demise: Rides on left side of street between parallel-parked cars and oncoming traffic; while doing so a car moves out, hitting him
4. Mossby Pomegranate
  - License/Register
  - Sin: Sloth
  - Fate: Had his bicycle stolen before the trip and unsuccessfully tries to run along with the bicycles. Last seen on the curb, having given up from fallen arches. (While licensing and registration of bicycles was still available in the mid-20th century, the practice is now obsolete, and attempts to reintroduce bicycle registration in the 21st century have been soundly rejected. The film posits that had the bicycle been registered, police would have been able to find it and identify the thief more quickly.)
5. "Slim" Jim Maguffny
6. Trigby Phipps
  - Ride Alone
  - Sin: Gluttony (Slim), giving into peer pressure (Trigby)
  - Demise: Because Slim overate himself to the point of obesity, his bicycle collapsed under his weight before the trip. Slim asks to ride on the front of Trigby Phipps's bicycle; because Slim blocks Trigby's view and makes it difficult for him to steer, Trigby veers right into an open manhole and both fall in
7. Nelbert ("Nel") Zwieback
  - Yield
  - Sin: Anger/wrath
  - Demise: Nel's road rage prompts her to angrily switch to the sidewalk (something that was noted as being illegal in her jurisdiction) and refused to yield right of way to two oncoming pedestrians with groceries. The pedestrians were propelled into a nearby tree.
8. Filbert ("Fil") Bagel
  - Tune Up
  - Sin: Neglect
  - Demise: Fil assumes that he will be getting a new bike soon so he neglects his current bike. The brakes no longer work, resulting in Filbert being run over by a steam roller
9. Stanislaw ("Stan") Hickenbottom
  - Lights/Reflectors
  - Sin: Stupidity ("not bright enough")
  - Demise: He rides his bike into a tunnel without any way to be seen. He collides with something in the tunnel, which cannot be seen due to the darkness
10. Orville ("Orv") Slump
  - Fate: As he obeyed all of the traffic rules, he made it to the picnic, alone. Orv is revealed, unlike his friends, not to be a monkey. He is the one who "got fat."

The actors include the children of director of photography Max Hutto (Dick and Colleen Hutto) and art director Ralph Hulett's wife and son (Shirley and Ralph Hulett, Jr.,) along with a number of their friends from school.

== Reception and legacy ==
After experiencing a mild revival of popularity on the Internet, the film was presented as a RiffTrax feature in April 2008, with commentary by Michael J. Nelson, Bill Corbett, and Kevin Murphy; they described the film as a "concentrated dose of lab-purified nightmare fuel" and said that it makes monkeys more terrifying than they already are. The film was also featured on Cracked, in the "Worst Lessons PSAs Accidentally Taught Us" episode of Michael Swaim's video show Does Not Compute, and again as number five of "Five Most Excessively Creepy Children's Educational Videos".

Footage from the film is used in several music videos, such as "Bloody Palms" by Phantogram electronic rock band, "Fool's Life" by Dr. Dog, "St. Peter" by Black Spiders, "January" by Venetian Snares, "Oh, Me; Oh, My" by Nerf Herder, "Condotta, Condottiere" by Mauk Tenieb, and "Aerosol Ball" by The Felice Brothers. Since their 2011 Green Naugahyde tour, Primus has played clips of the film during performances of "Here Come the Bastards." A tribute to the original movie can be seen in the video for "20 Inches of Monkey" by The Lamps.

Clips were also featured in the "Death" episode of the Adult Swim series Off the Air. The film has probably reached its largest audience via its use in fan-made YouTube music videos for "Everything You Do Is a Balloon" by Boards of Canada and "I'm the Devil" by Clams Casino.
