= Too Much Business =

1922 film

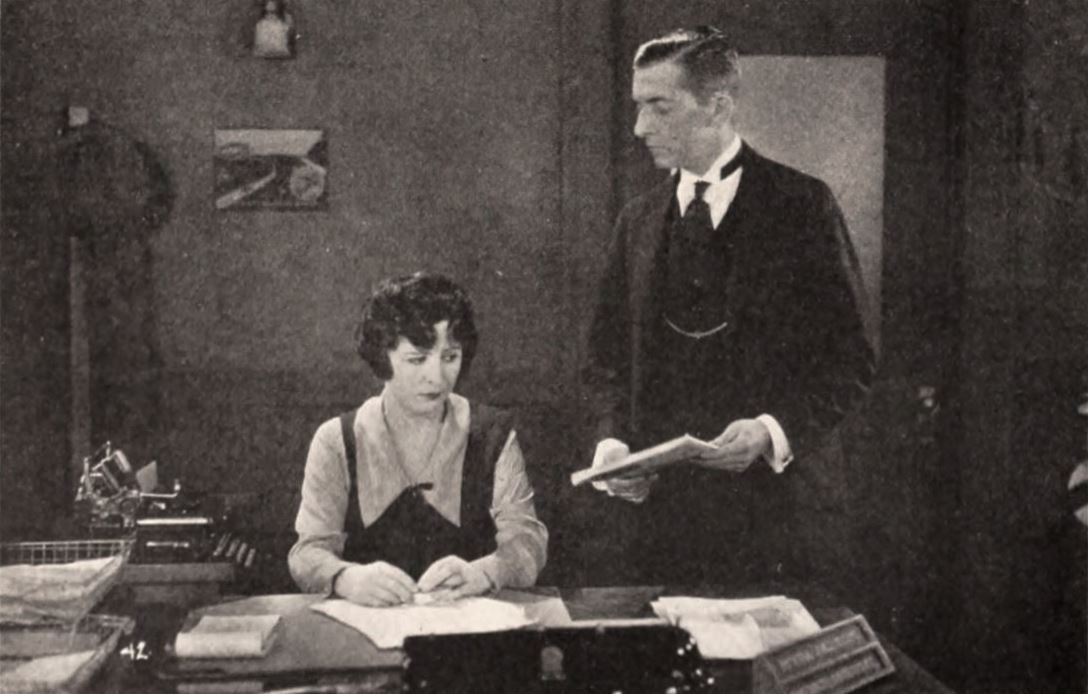
- Directed by: Jess Robbins
- Written by: Ford Beebe
- Produced by: Albert E. Smith
- Starring: Edward Everett Horton; Ethel Grey Terry; Tully Marshall
- Cinematography: Irving Reis
- Production company: Vitagraph Company of America
- Distributed by: Vitagraph Company of America
- Release date: April 9, 1922
- Running time: 70 minutes
- Country: United States
- Languages: Silent; English intertitles

Too Much Business is a 1922 American silent comedy film directed by Jess Robbins and starring Edward Everett Horton, Ethel Grey Terry and Tully Marshall.

== Cast ==
- Edward Everett Horton as John Henry Jackson
- Ethel Grey Terry as Myra Dalton
- Tully Marshall as Amos Comby
- John Steppling as Simon Stecker
- Carl Gerard as Ray Gorham
- Elsa Lorimer as Mrs. Comby
- Helen Gilmore as The Head Nurse
- Mark Fenton as Robert Gray
- Tom Murray as Officer 16

== Bibliography ==
- Connelly, Robert B. The Silents: Silent Feature Films, 1910-36, Volume 40, Issue 2. December Press, 1998.
- Munden, Kenneth White. The American Film Institute Catalog of Motion Pictures Produced in the United States, Part 1. University of California Press, 1997.
