= The Chevrolet Tele-Theatre =

American anthology TV series (1948–1950)

- Also known as: Chevrolet on Broadway; The Broadway Playhouse
- Genre: Anthology
- Written by: Tad Mosel; Emlyn Williams; Ernest Kinoy
- Directed by: Barry Bernard; Garry Simpson; Gordon Duff (director)
- Country of origin: United States
- Original language: English
- No. of seasons: 2
- No. of episodes: 82

Production
- Editor: Vic McLeod
- Running time: 25 minutes

Original release
- Network: NBC
- Release: September 27, 1948 – June 26, 1950

The Chevrolet Tele-Theatre is an American anthology series that aired live on NBC Mondays at 8 pm EST from September 27, 1948 to June 26, 1950. The program presented both news headlines and live dramatic performances of either original plays or works adapted for television from the stage. Sometimes the show was referred to as Chevrolet on Broadway or The Broadway Playhouse; particularly when the program was presenting an adapted stage work from New York City's theatre scene.

The sponsor was Chevrolet, an automobile division of General Motors. Beginning with the January 4, 1949, episode, the Chevrolet Central Office of General Motors was the sponsor, replacing Chevrolet dealers' groups.

== Production ==
Owen Davis Jr. was the program's first producer. When he died in a boating accident, Victor McLeod replaced him. Barry Bernard and Garry Simpson were the directors. The program originated from WNBT.

Effective January 24, 1949, the program was moved to the 8:30-9 p.m. Eastern Time slot on Mondays. That change allowed it to be shown live in the Midwest, via use of coaxial cable, rather than just in the East as had been the case in its previous time slot (30 minutes earlier on Mondays). The change meant that it was shown simultaneously on 12 NBC stations.

== Critical reception ==
A review of the January 31, 1949, broadcast in the trade publication Variety called the episode "a neat comedy playlet" that featured "sharp lines snappily rendered by two vet thespers". It also complimented the way the one-act play was adapted for television.

== Episode status ==
One episode from October 1949 is stored at the Library of Congress, along with three other episodes from that year, plus an episode from 1950. There are five kinescope recordings of 1948 programs also archived at Library of Congress, and an interview with one of the people involved in the production appears on the Archives of American Television Web Site. However, these aging 69+ year old kinescope film prints have yet to be transferred to modern media to ensure the survival of the episodes.

=== Episodes ===
Partial List of Episodes of The Chevrolet Tele-Theatre
| Date | Episode Title | Actors |
|---|---|---|
| November 22, 1948 | "The Flattering Word" | ZaSu Pitts |
| January 31, 1949 | "All's Fair" | Mary Boland, Roland Young, Patricia Kirkland, Kevin McCarthy |
| November 21, 1949 | "Hart to Heart" | Donald Curtis, Miriam Hopkins, Charles Martin |
| December 19, 1949 | "The Priceless Gift" | Lee Tracy, Mary Patton, Maurice Franklin, Harry Hugenot |
| December 26, 1949 | "I Cover Times Square"* | Harold Huber, Jean Carson, Adrienne Bayon |
| February 20, 1950 | "Once to Every Boy" | Carmen Mathews, Billy James, Howard Smith |
| May 29, 1950 | "Letter to Edith" | Nelson Olmstead, Alfreda Wallace |
| June 26, 1950 | "The Veranda" | Hiram Sherman, Nydia Westman |

- "I Cover Times Square" was a pilot for the ABC TV series I Cover Times Square.

== Guest stars ==
Jonathan Harris's TV debut came on The Chevrolet Tele-Theatre in the 1949 episode "His Name Is Jason".

Other actors who appeared in the series included:

- Eddie Albert
- Don Ameche
- Mischa Auer
- Fay Bainter
- Bertha Belmore
- Gertrude Berg
- Elisabeth Bergner
- John Carradine
- Leo G. Carroll
- Jackie Cooper
- Hume Cronyn
- Brian Donlevy
- Faye Emerson
- Nanette Fabray
- Nina Foch
- Dick Foran
- Will Geer
- Rex Harrison
- Edward Everett Horton
- Dean Jagger
- Boris Karloff
- Guy Kibbee
- Canada Lee
- Paul Lukas
- E.G. Marshall
- Mercedes McCambridge
- Felicia Montealegre Bernstein
- Paul Muni
- Barry Nelson
- Luise Rainer
- Basil Rathbone
- Charles Ruggles
- Margaret Sullavan
- Arthur Treacher
- Ernest Truex
- Forrest Tucker

== See also ==
- 1948-49 United States network television schedule
- 1949-50 United States network television schedule
- Sham - Play which was adapted as an episode of the series
