= Malcolm Williams (actor) =

American actor

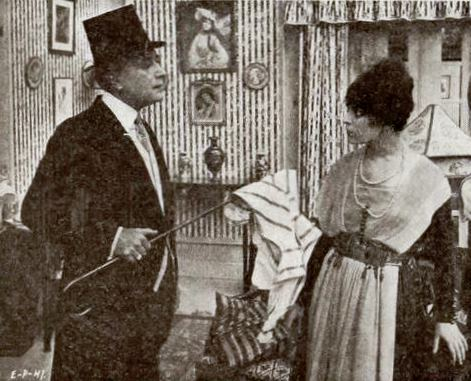
- Williams and Ketty Galanta in Empty Pockets, 1918
- Born: July 16, 1870; Spring Valley, Minnesota
- Died: June 10, 1937 (aged 66); New York, New York
- Occupations: actor, composer
- Years active: 1896-1931
- Spouse: Florence Reed (1908–1937; his death)

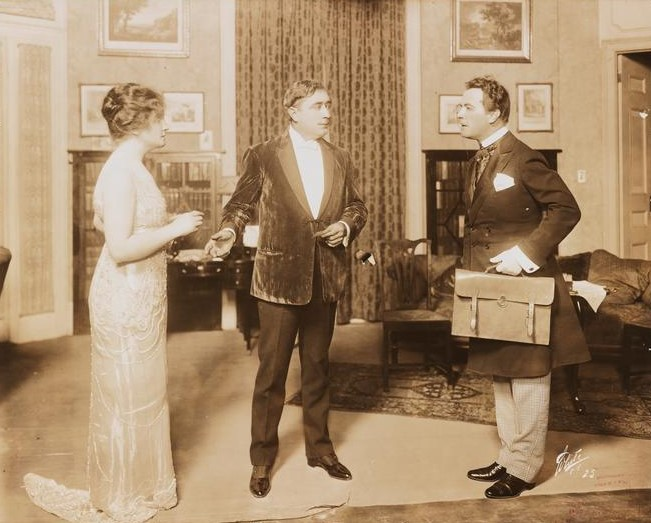
The Phantom Rival: Laura Hope Crews, Malcolm Williams, Leo Ditrichstein

Malcolm Williams (July 16, 1870, in Spring Valley, Minnesota – June 10, 1937, in New York, New York) was an American actor and composer.

By February 1896 he had moved to New York City and played Phillip Norwood in Charles Dazey's melodrama The War of Wealth on Broadway at the Star Theatre. The play was inspired by the Panic of 1893. In the 1900 census he was listed as a resident of the Ashland House Hotel on Park Avenue South (4th Ave. then) and 24th St. in New York City.

== Family ==
Malcolm Edgar Williams was the son of John H. and Sarah Williams. Malcolm married actress Florence Reed in February 1908. They often appeared in Broadway shows together and sometimes collaborated writing music. They had no children.

== Broadway ==
- The War of Wealth (1896) as Philip Norwood
- Polly of the Circus (1907) as Rev. John Douglass
- Madame X (1910) as Laroque
- Master of the House as Frederick Hoffman
- The Typhoon
- The Painted Woman (1913)
- The Phantom Rival (1914)
- Idol of the Stage (1916)
- Roads of Destiny (1918) as Alec Harvey
- The Mirage (1920) as Henry M. Galt
- The Wisdom Tooth (1926) as Mr. Porter
- Beyond the Horizon (1926) as James Mayo
- The Breaks (1928) as Manson
- Little Accident (1928) as J.J. Overbeck

== Selected filmography ==
- The Brute (1914) as Donald Rogers
- The Dancing Girl as a Quaker
- Idol of the Stage (1916) as Philip Van Kortland
- Down East (1917)
- Empty Pockets (1918)
- The Saphead (1920) (producer)
- Lightnin' (1925) (writer)
- The First Kiss (1928)

== Musical compositions ==
- "I Love My Dolly Best" (1898)
- "My watermelon boy" (1899)
- "Kiss Me Good-Night, Dear" feature song in 1903 comedy play Merely Mary Ann collaborated with Israel Zangwill
