= Ekaterina Galanta =

Russian dancer

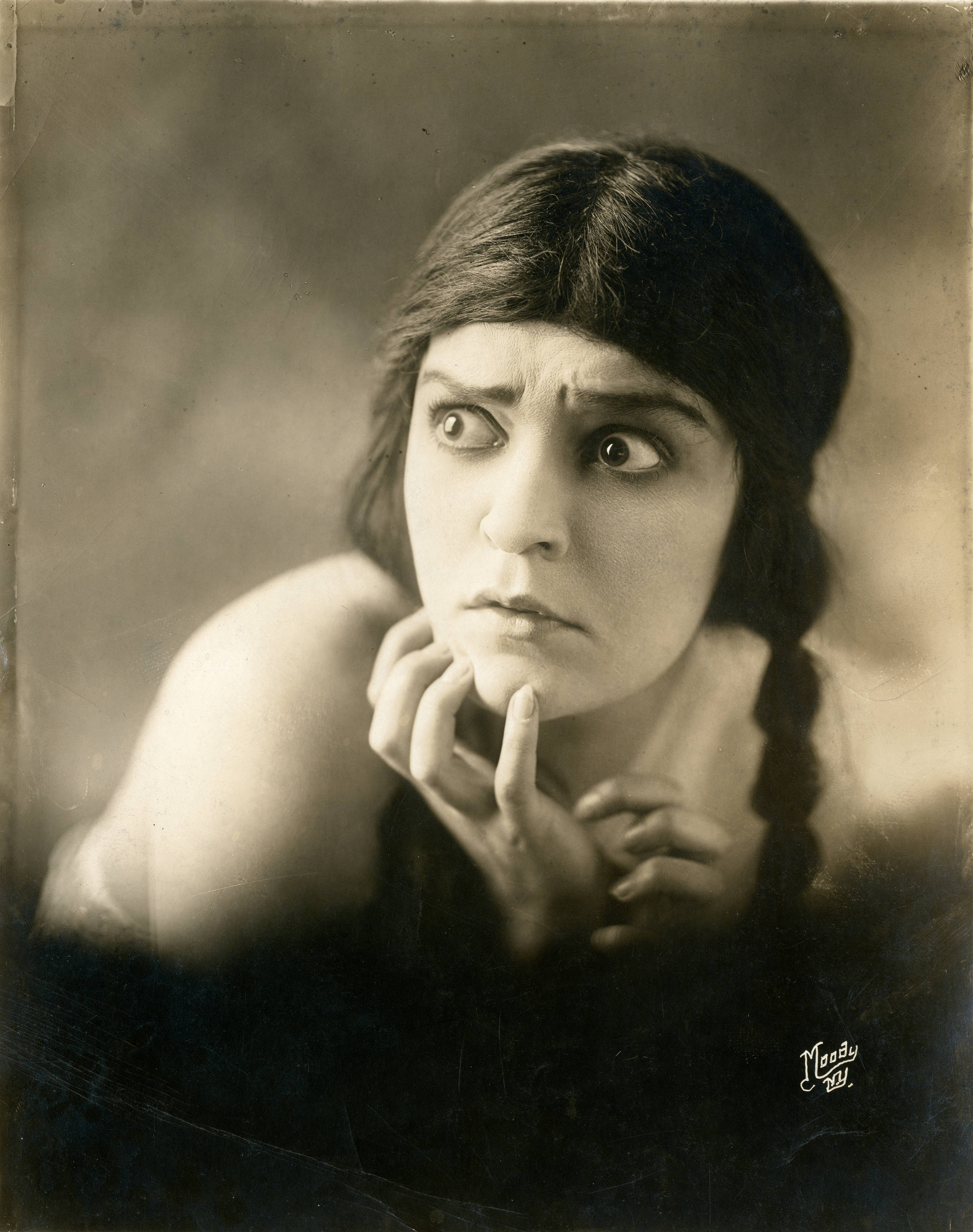
- Galanta, 1923
- Born: Ekaterina Nikolayevna de Galanta c. 1895; St. Petersburg (Petrograd)
- Other names: Ekaterina de Galanta, Katerina Galanta, Ketty Galanta, Ketty de Galantha, Kitty Galanta
- Occupation: dancer
- Known for: Ballets Russes

Ekaterina Nikolayevna de Galanta (Russian: Екатерина Николаевна фон Галанта; born c. 1895), often billed as Ketty Galanta, was a Russian ballerina and member of the Ballets Russes.

== Early life ==
Galanta was born and raised in Saint Petersburg. She was the daughter of Nikolai von Galanta/de Galanta, from a Hungarian noble family Esterházy de Galántha. In 1917, she was described as being 20 or 21 years old. Nikolai Legat was her first ballet teacher.

== Career ==
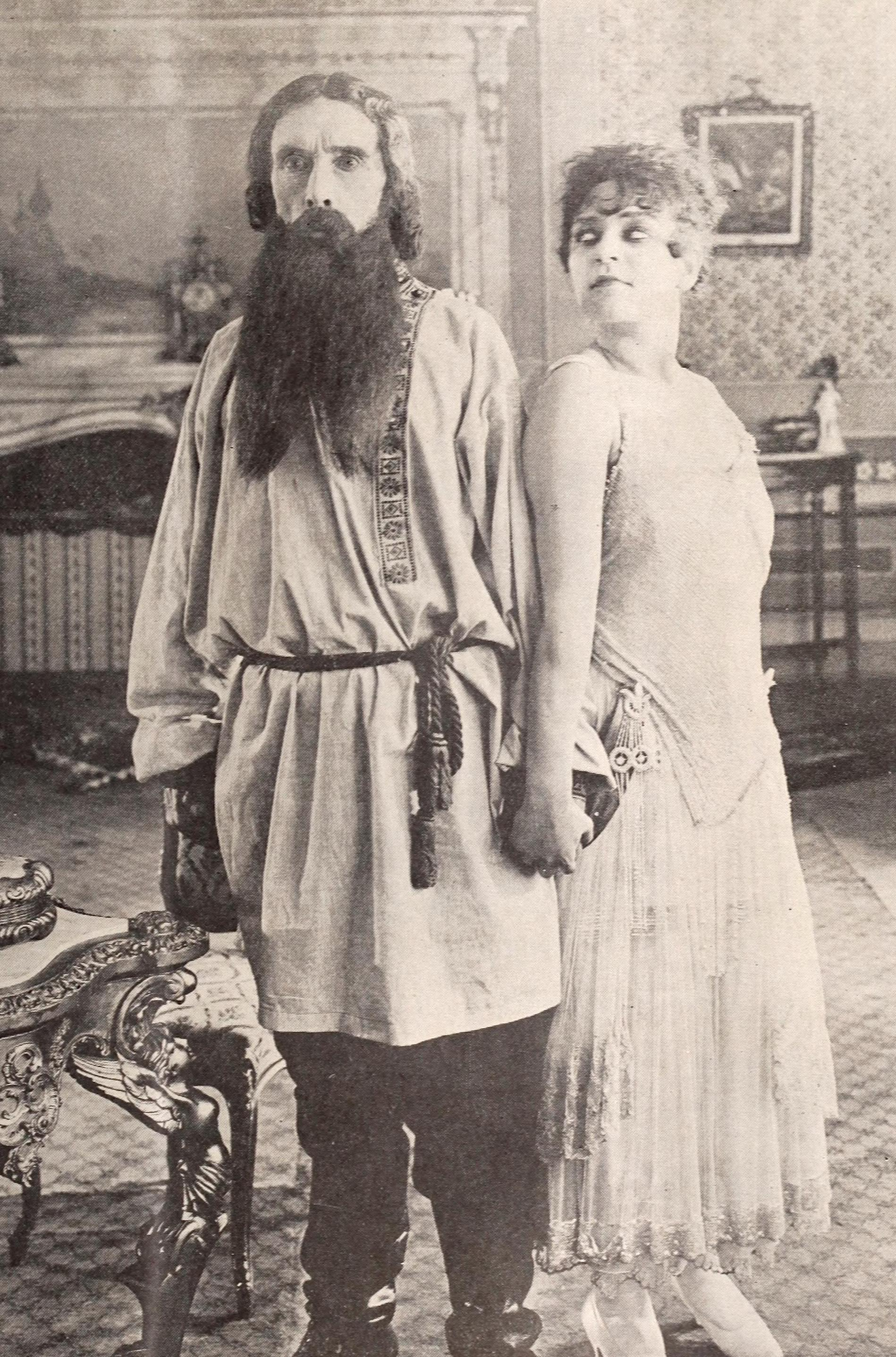
Galanta as Anna Vyrubova with Edward Connelly as Rasputin in The Fall of the Romanoffs, 1917

Galanta toured in the United States with the Ballets Russes in 1916, with Vaslav Nijinsky, Adolph Bolm, Flore Revalles, Lydia Lopokova, Olga Spessivtseva, and Valentina Kachouba, among others in the company of forty dancers. When the ballet company left the United States, she stayed behind to pursue a solo stage career. She danced at the Metropolitan Opera House in Petruschka (1916). While she was principal dancer in The Wanderer in New York in 1917, she was a mentor to American dancer Martha Lorber. In 1918 she was featured as a dancer in the musical Chu Chin Chow.

Herbert Brenon cast Galanta in the silent film The Fall of the Romanoffs (1917, now lost). One critic found her performance distracting, saying "Ketty Galanta is vivid in the role of Anna; [her eyes] roll in a fashion so marvelous that one fears they may pop out of her head; consequently, the audience gasps in wonderment when it should merely feel the thrill of emotion." She appeared in two more films, both directed by Brenon, Empty Pockets (1918), a murder mystery with Malcolm Williams, and The Passing of the Third Floor Back (1918), based on the Jerome K. Jerome play, and starring Johnston Forbes-Robertson.

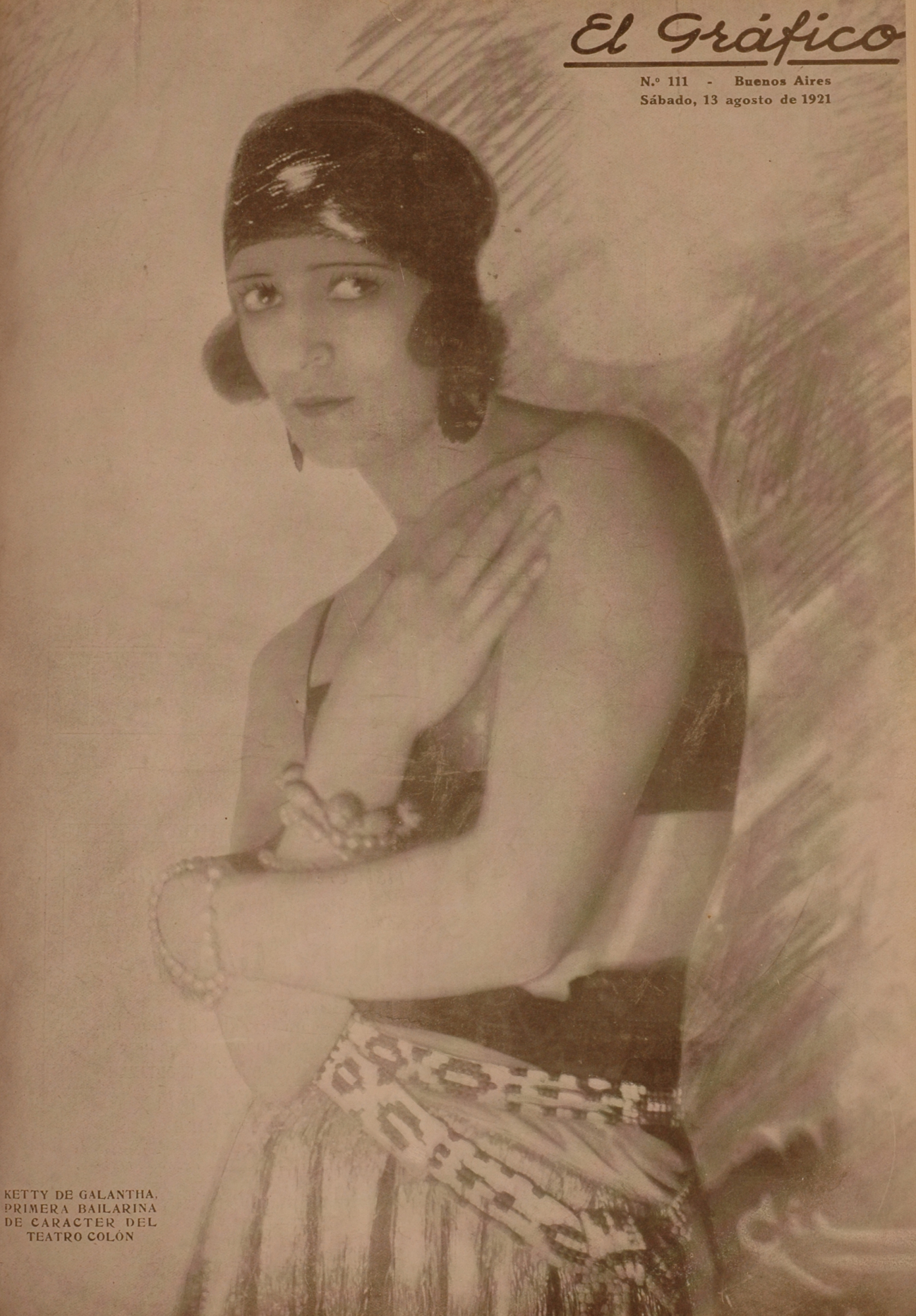
Ketty de Galantha on the cover of the Argentine magazine El Gráfico in 1921.

By 1922, Galanta moved to South America, where she taught dance at her own studio in Buenos Aires, Argentina. One of her students in Buenos Aires was María Fux. She was one of the founders of the Friends of Dance Association (AADA) there, along with fellow Ballets Russes dancer Tamara Grigorieva.
