= Empty Pockets =

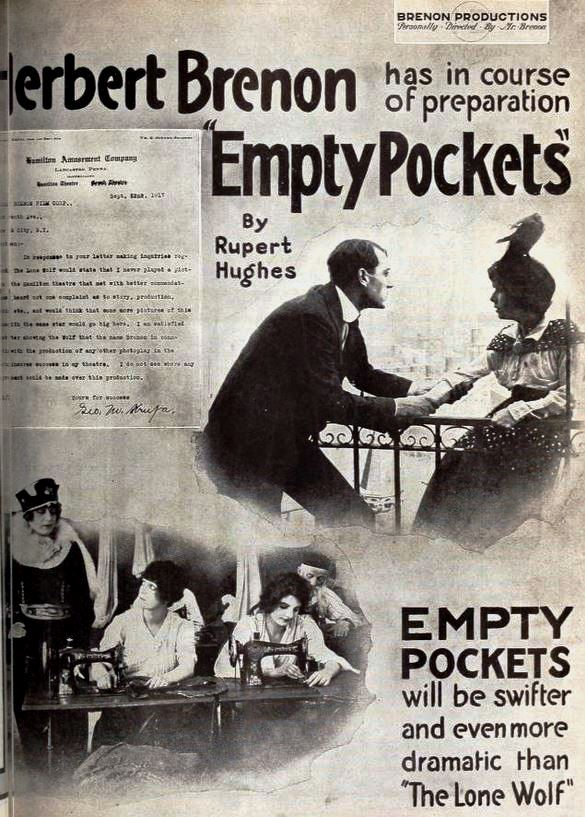
- Advertisement on Exhibitors Herald
- Directed by: Herbert Brenon
- Written by: George Edwards Hall
- Based on: Novel by Rupert Hughes
- Produced by: Herbert Brenon
- Production company: Herbert Brenon Film Corporation
- Distributed by: First National Pictures
- Release date: January 20, 1918
- Country: United States

Empty Pockets is a lost 1918 American mystery silent black and white film directed by Herbert Brenon and written by George Edwards Hall. It is based on the novel by Rupert Hughes.

== Cast ==
- Bert Lytell as Dr. Clinton Worthing
- Barbara Castleton as Muriel Schuyler
- Peggy Betts as Pet Bettanny
- Malcolm Williams as Perry Merrithew
- Ketty Galanta as Maryla Sokalska
- Susanne Willa as Red Ida Ganley
- Ben Graham as Jacob Schuyler
- J. Thornton Baston as Shang Ganley
