= The Brute (1914 film) =

- Directed by: Thomas N. Heffron
- Based on: novel and play The Brute by Frederic Arnold Kummer c.1912
- Produced by: Daniel Frohman; Adolph Zukor
- Starring: Malcolm Williams; Helen Hilton; House Peters
- Distributed by: State Rights
- Release date: April 27, 1914
- Running time: 4 reels
- Country: USA
- Language: Silent..English titles

The Brute is a lost 1914 early silent feature film directed by Thomas N. Heffron and starring stage actor Malcolm Williams. It was produced by Adolph Zukor and Daniel Frohman. The film was released on a State Rights basis.

== Cast ==
- Malcolm Williams - Donald Rogers 'The Brute'
- Helen Hilton - Edith Pope
- House Peters - Billy West
- Mary Moore - Alice Pope
- Camilla Dalberg - Mrs. Pope (*as Madam Dahlberg)
- William Vaughn - Emerson Hall (*see Wilhelm von Brincken)
- Jack Darling - Bobbie Rogers

== See also ==
- List of Paramount Pictures films
