= To the Ladies (play) =

1922 play by George S. Kaufman and Marc Connelly

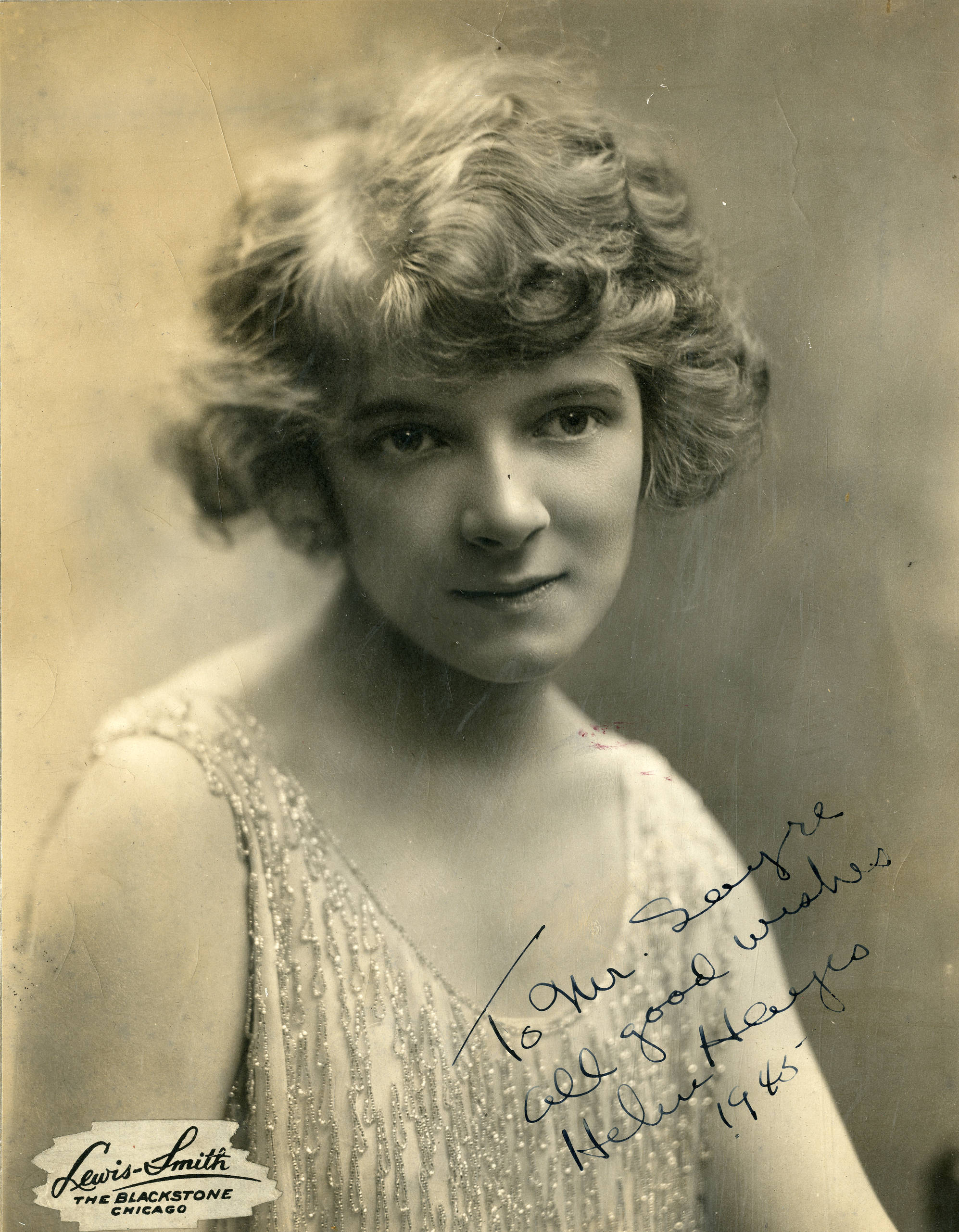
- Helen Hayes 1922
- Original language: English
- Written by: George S. Kaufman and Marc Connelly
- Subject: Wife guides her husband to success
- Genre: Comedy
- Setting: The Beebe home in Nutley, New Jersey, Hotel Commodore and office of John Kincaid's Sons, New York City

Premiere
- Date: February 20, 1922
- Place: Liberty Theatre
- Directed by: Howard Lindsay

To the Ladies is a 1922 play by George S. Kaufman and Marc Connelly. The play's title occasionally appears with an exclamation point at the end. It is a fast-paced three-act comedy with four scenes, three settings, and fourteen characters. The story concerns the efforts of a newly married wife to help her scatter-brained husband rise in his career. It was written to order as a vehicle for Helen Hayes, to give her a domestic role rather than the flappers she had been playing.

The play was first produced by Abe Erlanger and George C. Tyler, staged by Howard Lindsay, and starred Hayes and Otto Kruger. After a tryout in Rochester, New York, the play made its Broadway premiere in February 1922, running through June 1922, for over 125 performances.

The play was never revived on Broadway, but was adapted for a 1923 silent film.

== Characters ==
Characters are listed in order of appearance within their scope.

Lead

- Leonard Beebe is 25, of middle-class background; ambitious, but unfocused and gullible.
- Elsie Beebe is Leonard's wife from Mobile, Alabama; efficient, intelligent, and resourceful.

Supporting

- Chester Mullin is a young man who lives with his parents; a dreamer of vaudeville glory.
- John Kincaid is the 4th generation head of John Kincaid's Sons, a piano manufacturer.
- Mrs. Kincaid, called Myrtle, is John's wife and the controlling factor in his life.

Featured

- A Truckman is Mr. Carney of McEvoy Express, doing a repossession for Diamond Loan Company.
- Second Truckman is Carney's sarcastic and insolent assistant.
- The Toastmaster is W. J. Henrici, a department head at John Kincaid's Sons.
- The Politician is Martin L. Cassidy, a ward heeler and guest speaker.
- Tom Baker is a promising young employee at John Kincaid's Sons.
- The Stenographer is Miss Fletcher, who works for John Kincaid.
- The Barber comes to the office to trim John Kincaid's hair.

Voice only

- Mr. Moffam is heard speaking about a strike at opening of Act II Scene 2.

Bit Players

- The Photographer
- The Bootblack
- Guests at banquet (4)

== Synopsis ==
The Beebe's live on the ground floor of a two family home, with Chester Mullin and his parents living above them. The Beebe's have been married six months. Leonard Beebe is a clerk with John Kincaid's Sons, a piano manufacturer. Chester also works there in a lower position. Leonard is hoping to be promoted to Chief Clerk, for the Beebe's are running a deficit due to Leonard's investing in a grapefruit farm in Florida.

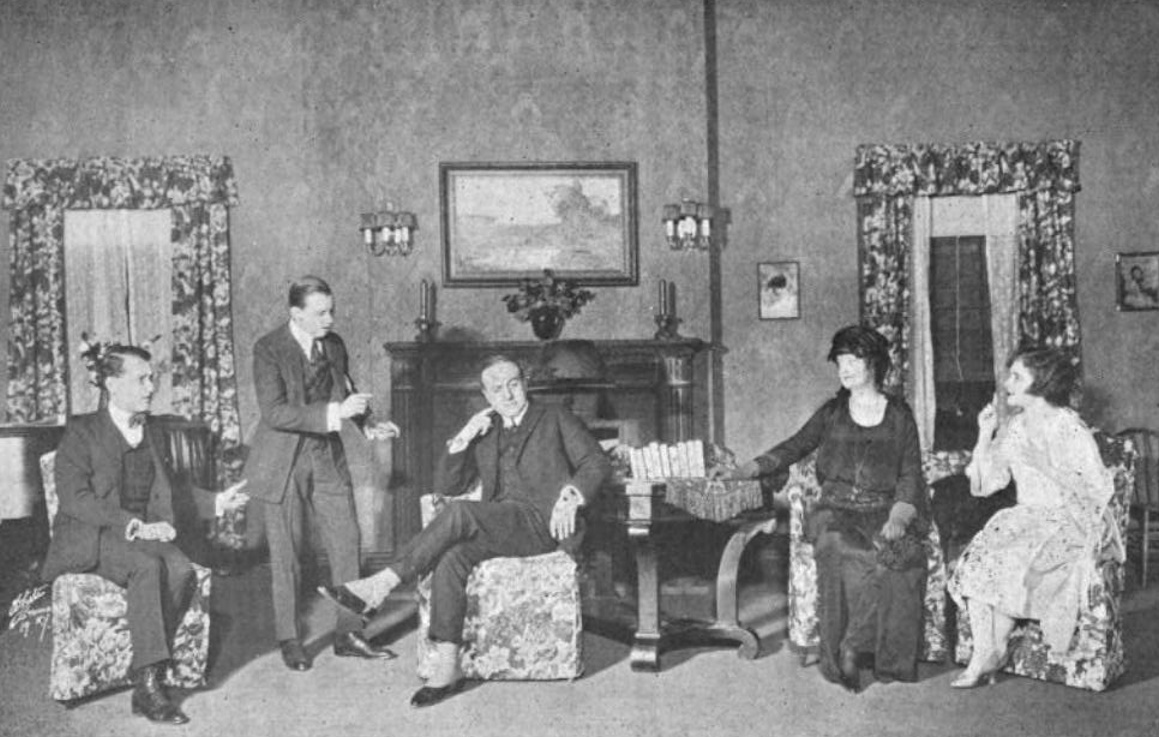

Act I (The Beebe's living room, in Nutley, New Jersey. Saturday afternoon.) Leonard and Elsie fuss around waiting for the Kincaids to arrive. Elsie is ready to play their Kincaid piano and sing when they do come, but is worried about the unpaid bill for it. Chester drops in to their annoyance. He has heard about the visit and is determined to get something out of it. When the Kincaids arrive, he tries to pitch Mr. Kincaid to back his vaudeville act but is shot down. Elsie is ready to play the piano when two truckmen arrive to repossess it. John Kincaid pays the overdue amount for the Beebes. He and Mrs. Kincaid prepare to depart, obviously disappointed in the Beebe's profligacy. However, Elsie persuades them by explaining how Leonard has invested a lot of money into a grapefruit farm, hence their indebtedness. She convinces Mrs. Kincaid, not of Leonard's worthiness, but of her own. Mrs. Kincaid gives Mr. Kincaid the signal, and he invites the Beebes to the annual banquet for top employees. After they leave, Leonard is determined to give a speech from out of an advertised book of speeches, which he buys after borrowing $3 from Chester. (Curtain)

Act II (Scene 1: Same, two weeks later.) Leonard rehearses speech number 47 from the book he bought. Elsie quizzes him to make sure he understands when and how to deliver the phrases. When the evening newspaper is delivered, Leonard reads that his grapefruit farm was a scam and the perpetrator has been arrested. Chester arrives, listens to the speech, and announces he's quitting John Kincaid's Sons to go on the road with vaudeville... but not right away. He leaves when the taxi comes to take the Beebe's to the annual banquet. As they exit, Leonard realizes he's forgotten his speech, only to see Elsie pull it from her purse and smile. (Black out-- dark change to second scene)

(Scene 2: The annual dinner of John Kincaid's Sons, Hotel Commodore, New York City.) Thirteen people sit in a row at a banquet table, facing the audience. From off to the right an off-stage speaker drones on about a strike at the company's Framingham plant. The Toastmaster hurridley thanks him at a pause, and quickly introduces the Politician, who gives a short speech. Next is John Kincaid, who is applauded and cheered immoderately by his employees. He introduces Tom Baker, Leonard's rival for the Chief Clerk position. Within two sentences the Beebes realize he is delivering speech number 47, the same one Leonard memorized. Leonard is paralyzed when called to speak next, but Elsie saves the day by claiming he has laryngitis. She will deliver a speech Leonard wrote she informs the waiting audience, and makes one up impromptu. The speech is received well, and Leonard is once more grateful to his loyal and resourceful wife. (Curtain)

Act III (The outer office of Mr. Kinkaid, New York City, six months later.) Leonard has been promoted to Mr. Kincaid's secretary on the basis of Elsie's speech. He has filled the office with labor-saving gadgets that either don't work or are too difficult to operate. Nevertheless, the efficient Miss Fletcher manages to cope. Elsie arrives to meet Leonard for lunch. He introduces her to Miss Fletcher; the women eye each other for possible threats to their respective positions. Chester enters to pester Miss Fletcher who quickly departs. Elsie goes to wait for Leonard in the lobby. Tom Baker comes in next, and through Chester's ignorance, learns Leonard was planning to deliver speech number 47 at the banquet. Tom accuses Leonard of hiding behind his wife, which Mr. Kincaid overhears. He decides to rescind Leonard's promotion, but Elsie returns in time to forestall him. She has brought Mrs. Kincaid with her. The two women join forces to remind Mr. Kincaid who really runs his company. He backs down, and the Beebe's embrace. (Curtain)

== Original production ==
=== Background ===
Producer George C. Tyler had given George S. Kaufman and Marc Connelly an assignment to write a play for Lynn Fontanne, which they had done successfully with Dulcy. This was still playing on Broadway when he handed them another task. He asked them to write a play for Helen Hayes that would give her a different type of part than a flapper. They had two weeks to do it, after which rehearsals would start. Kaufman and Connelly completed the play in January 1922, but Tyler rejected the original third act and asked for a rewrite. This was completed in time for co-producers Abe Erlanger and Tyler to announce rehearsals in early February 1922.

The core of the play is a hotel banquet scene in Act II Scene 2, based on a real-life banquet experienced by a "prominent man" at the Hotel Biltmore. The play relocates the banquet to the Hotel Commodore, and employed a head waiter from the same to help stage the scene. At least one reviewer suggested an alternate explanation for the play, as an apology to women by the playwrights for the lead character of Dulcy.

=== Cast ===
Principal cast during the Rochester tryout and the Broadway run.
Role	Actor	Dates	Notes and sources
Leonard Beebe	Otto Kruger	Feb 13, 1922 - Jun 10, 1922	
Elsie Beebe	Helen Hayes	Feb 13, 1922 - Jun 10, 1922	
John Kincaid	George Howell	Feb 13, 1922 - Jun 10, 1922	
Mrs. Kincaid	Isabel Irving	Feb 13, 1922 - Jun 10, 1922	
Chester Mullin	Percy Helton	Feb 13, 1922 - Jun 10, 1922	
Tom Baker	Robert Fiske	Feb 13, 1922 - Jun 10, 1922	
A Truckman	J. J. Hyland	Feb 13, 1922 - Jun 10, 1922	
Second Truckman	Albert Cowels	Feb 13, 1922 - Jun 10, 1922	
The Toastmaster	William Seymour	Feb 13, 1922 - Jun 10, 1922	
The Politician	William F. Canfield	Feb 13, 1922 - Jun 10, 1922	
The Stenographer	Norma Mitchell	Feb 13, 1922 - Apr 01, 1922	Mitchell left for a larger role in The Goldfish, by Paul Armont and Marcel Gerbidon.
The Stenographer	Jean Dixon	Apr 03, 1922 - Jun 10, 1922	Producer Tyler said this was Dixon's first Broadway performance.
The Barber	John Kennedy	Feb 13, 1922 - Jun 10, 1922	

=== Tryout ===
The play had a week-long tryout at the Lyceum Theatre in Rochester, New York, starting February 13, 1922. Helen Hayes and Otto Kruger were given equal billing, below the title, in newspaper ads. The local reviewer was convinced the play worked due to the light touch of the playwrights in presenting a satire of domestic and business life, with Hayes' performance overcoming any male resistance. They felt, however, that the third act was a little artificial and needed work, while the humor relied too much on the "embarrassment, anxiety, and nervousness of young Beebe". The performances of all the actors was thought good, as was the staging by Howard Lindsay.

=== Broadway premiere and reception ===
To the Ladies had its Broadway premiere at the Liberty Theatre on February 20, 1922. The Brooklyn Daily Eagle critic paused their review of American comedy long enough to say Hayes and Kruger overplayed a bit, but that Percy Helton was steady, George Howell and Isabel Irving were good, as was Howard Lindsay's direction.

Alexander Woollcott wrote that the story of To the Ladies was an anecdote spun into a three-act play. Its artistic success was the satirization of after-dinner speeches at a banquet. Woollcott also felt George Howell and Isabel Irving turned in the best performances, while Hayes and Kruger overreacted, possibly to opening night jitters.

=== Broadway closing ===
The production closed on Broadway at the Liberty Theatre on June 10, 1922.

== Adaptations ==
=== Film ===
- To the Ladies (1923 film)

== Bibliography ==
- George S. Kaufman and Marc Connelly. To the Ladies: A Comedy in Three Acts. Samuel French, 1923.
- George C. Tyler and J. C. Furnas. Whatever Goes Up. Bobbs Merrill, 1934.
