= Edward Everett Horton =

American character actor (1886–1970)

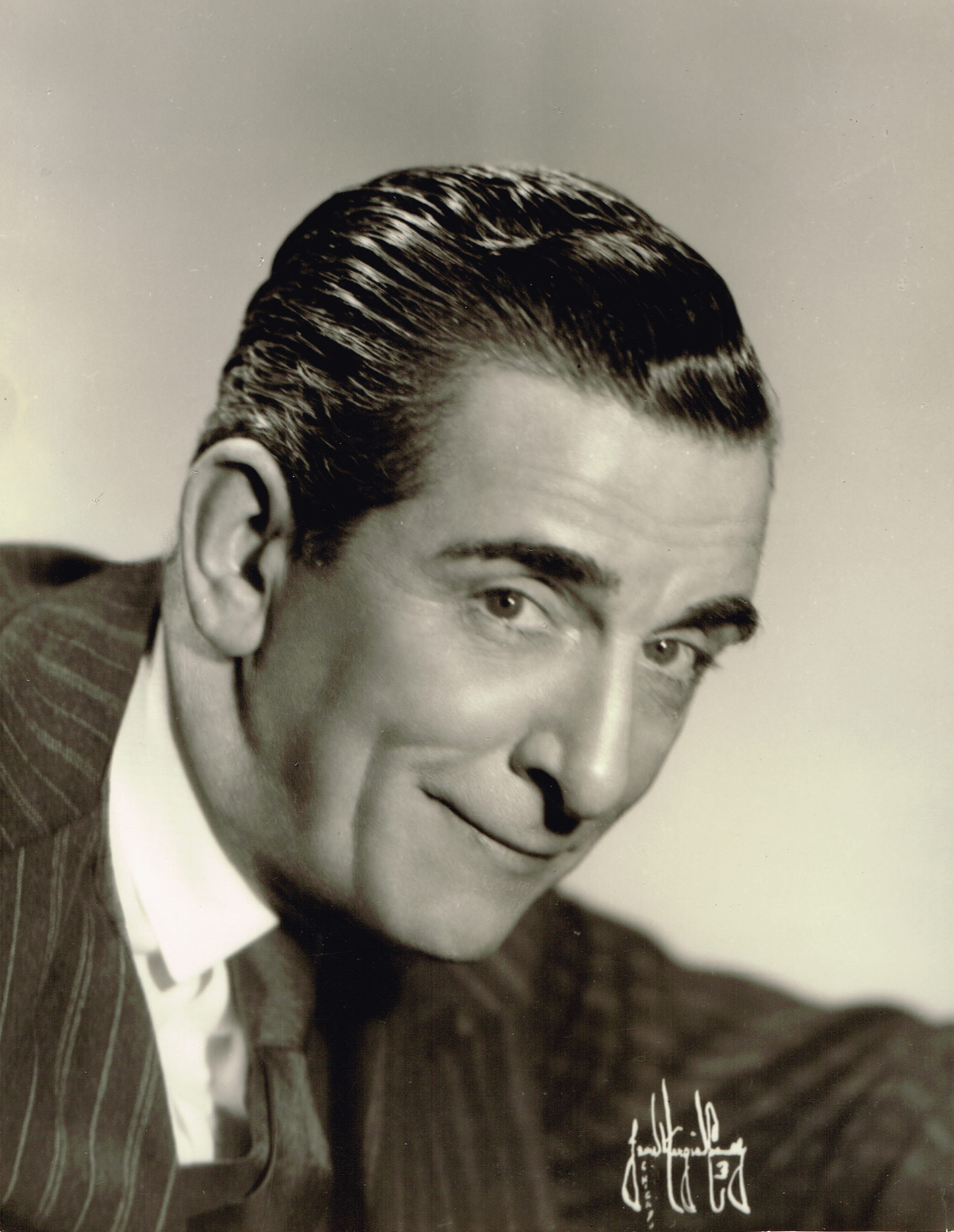
- Horton in 1941
- Born: Edward Everett Horton, Jr. March 18, 1886; New York City, U.S.
- Died: September 29, 1970 (aged 84); Los Angeles, California, U.S.
- Resting place: Forest Lawn Memorial Park Cemetery, Glendale, California
- Education: Oberlin College (no degree); Brooklyn Polytechnic; Columbia University
- Occupations: Actor; comedian; singer; dancer
- Years active: 1906–1970

Edward Everett Horton, Jr. (March 18, 1886 – September 29, 1970) was an American character actor and comedian. He had a long career in film, theater, radio, television, and voice work for animated cartoons.

== Early life ==
Horton was born March 18, 1886, on Long Island to Edward Everett Horton, a typesetter / compositor in the press room for The New York Times, and his wife, Isabella S. Horton (née Diack). His father was of English and German ancestry, and his mother was born in Matanzas Province, Cuba, to George and Mary (née Orr) Diack, natives of Scotland. He went to The Baltimore City College. He attended in 1902-1904 and later was inducted into the school's alumni/faculty Hall of Fame in 1959.

He was a student at Oberlin College where he majored in German. He was asked to leave after he climbed to the top of a building and, after a crowd gathered, threw off a dummy, making bystanders think he had jumped. Returning to New York City, he attended the Polytechnic Institute of Brooklyn for one year, until the school discontinued its arts courses; he moved to Columbia University, "until I got fouled up with The Varsity Show of 1909. This was the first time I had really ever been on the stage ... After that, to put it gently, Columbia and I came to an amicable parting of the ways. They were just as glad to see me go as I was to get out." That concluded Horton's collegiate period.

== Stage and film career ==
Horton had begun his stage career at age 20 in 1906, singing and dancing and playing small parts in productions during his brief college experiences, then vaudeville and Broadway productions. His father persuaded him to adopt his full name professionally. "Originally, I went under the name of just Edward Horton. My father said, 'I think you're making a mistake, Edward. Anybody could be Edward Horton, but nobody else could be Edward Everett Horton.' I said, 'I think I like that.'"

In 1919, he moved to Los Angeles, where he got his start at the Hollywood Community Theater, founded and managed by Neely Dickson. He began acting in Hollywood films of the growing film community in southern California. His first starring role was in the silent film comedy Too Much Business (1922), and he portrayed the lead role of an idealistic young classical-music composer in the comedy Beggar on Horseback (1925). In 1927–29, he starred in eight two-reel silent comedies produced by Harold Lloyd for Paramount Pictures release. He made the transition to sound films with Educational Pictures in 1929, in a series of sound-comedy playlets. As a stage-trained performer, he found more film work easily and appeared in several Warner Bros. movies, including The Terror (1928) and Sonny Boy (1929).

== Fame as starring actor and character player ==
As Horton became known for his performances in movies, he continued to work on the legitimate stage, which he preferred. He appeared with Gavin Gordon in a 1931 production of Private Lives by Noël Coward.

Horton soon cultivated his own special variation of the double take (an actor's reaction to something, followed by a delayed, more extreme reaction). In Horton's version, he smiled ingratiatingly and nodded in agreement with what just happened; then, when realization set in, his facial features collapsed entirely into a sober, troubled mask.

Edward Everett Horton starred in many comedy features in the 1930s, usually playing a mousy fellow who put up with domestic or professional problems to a certain point and then finally asserted himself for a happy ending. He is best remembered, however, for his work in supporting roles. These credits include The Front Page (1931), Trouble in Paradise (1932), Alice in Wonderland (1933), The Gay Divorcee (1934, the first of several Astaire/Rogers films in which Horton appeared), Top Hat (1935), Shall We Dance (1937), Lost Horizon (1937), Holiday (1938), Here Comes Mr. Jordan (1941), Arsenic and Old Lace (1944), Pocketful of Miracles (1961), It's a Mad, Mad, Mad, Mad World (1963), and Sex and the Single Girl (1964). His last role was in the comedy film Cold Turkey (1971), in which his paralyzed character communicated only through facial expressions.

Horton continued to appear in stage productions, often in summer stock. His performance in the play Springtime for Henry became a perennial in summer theaters.

Horton was so prolific he sometimes found himself committed to two projects at the same time. One project would be in progress while the second project suddenly came up sooner than expected, forcing Horton to make other arrangements. In 1953, Horton announced on the ABC-TV game show The Name's the Same that his next picture would be one of the Ma and Pa Kettle comedies. A scheduling conflict compelled Horton to bow out, and his role in Ma and Pa Kettle at Home was played by Alan Mowbray.

In 1960, Horton was approached by his former director Frank Capra to work in the new film Pocketful of Miracles. Horton wanted to rejoin Capra, but had a commitment to finish a stage run of the play Once Upon a Mattress; the show wouldn't be closing for another two weeks. Horton phoned Buster Keaton, who had played the same role in an earlier production, and asked if Keaton could replace him. Keaton finished the play's run, and Horton made the Capra film.

In late 1963 Edward Everett Horton joined the national touring company of the Broadway hit A Funny Thing Happened on the Way to the Forum, alongside co-stars Jerry Lester, Arnold Stang, and Erik Rhodes. The show ran eleven months.

== Radio and television ==
From 1945 to 1947, Horton hosted radio's Kraft Music Hall. An early television appearance came in the play Sham, shown on The Chevrolet Tele-Theatre on December 13, 1948. During the 1950s, Horton worked primarily in television. One of his best-remembered appearances is in an episode of I Love Lucy, broadcast in 1952, in which he is cast against type as a frisky, amorous suitor. In 1960, he guest-starred on The Real McCoys as J. Luther Medwick, grandfather of the boyfriend of series character Hassie McCoy (Lydia Reed). In the story, Medwick clashes with the equally outspoken Grandpa Amos McCoy (played by Walter Brennan).

Edward Everett Horton is best known to younger Saturday-morning-television viewers of the "baby boomers" generation as the narrator of Fractured Fairy Tales, satires of famous fairy tales and legends from previous centuries. These were featured on the animated The Rocky and Bullwinkle Show (1959–1961), which originally aired from November 19, 1959, to June 27, 1964, and became a perennial TV attraction in reruns (on both the ABC and NBC networks, as well as in syndication to local TV stations).

In 1962, Horton portrayed the character Uncle Ned in three episodes of Dennis the Menace. In 1965, he guest-starred in an episode of The Cara Williams Show. He was memorably featured in the Western / U.S. Cavalry spoof F Troop (1965 and 1966) as "Roaring Chicken", medicine man of the neighboring non-hostile but cowardly Hekawi Indian tribe. This series, set after the American Civil War, starred Forrest Tucker, Larry Storch, and Ken Berry as soldiers at fictional Fort Courage. Horton thoroughly enjoyed the premise, as he related to reporter Margaret McManus: "I don't watch much television. I mean, if you have the thing on, you have to get up from your comfortable chair to turn it off. A nuisance. But I'm going to watch F Troop. I'll watch it if it kills me."

Two years later Horton echoed this "funny Indian" role on Batman as "Chief Screaming Chicken", a pawn of guest villain Vincent Price's "Egghead".

== Personal life ==
Horton never discussed his private life publicly, but in 1968 he granted an interview to writers Bernard Rosenberg and Harry Silverstein in which he reviewed his life and career, punctuated by self-effacing remarks ("Nobody's older than I am. Oh, a few people are, but they are not in circulation"). Published in 1970, the interview only skims through his personal relationships. Horton recalled that, rather than dating or nightclubbing, he would invite his female co-stars to attend parties he was throwing. "I never married. However, I have not given up hope. This is Leap Year [1968], you know."

== Death and legacy ==
Edward Everett Horton died of cancer on September 29, 1970, at age 84 in the Encino area of Los Angeles. His remains were interred in the Whispering Pines section of Forest Lawn Memorial Park Cemetery.

At the time of his death, Horton had lived on the property at 5521 Amestoy Avenue for 45 years, since purchasing the four-acre estate in 1925 that he named Belleigh Acres (pronounced "belly achers"). The land contained Horton's own house, adjacent houses for his brother and sister and their respective families, and a guest house. In 1938 F. Scott Fitzgerald rented the guest house from Horton (at $200 monthly, equal to $4,574 today), where Fitzgerald wrote his last novel, The Last Tycoon.

In the late 1950s, the state forced Horton to sell half of his property for construction of the Ventura Freeway. Horton's niece, Isabella Horton Grant, was an attorney (later a Superior Court judge) and she negotiated the state's purchase price. Horton insisted that he must not be told how much the state paid him; he wanted to disregard the windfall and remain financially uncertain, so he would have an incentive to keep working as an actor. The construction obliterated the tennis courts, one adjacent house, and the guest house; Horton was left with two acres and two houses, which he shared with his sister and brother. The construction left a short stump of Amestoy Avenue south of Burbank Boulevard. Shortly after his death the City of Los Angeles renamed that portion of the avenue Edward Everett Horton Lane in his honor.

For his contribution to the Hollywood motion picture industry, Horton has a star on the Hollywood Walk of Fame at 6427 Hollywood Boulevard.

== Tribute ==
British radio DJ and comedian Kenny Everett adopted the last name of Everett in honor of Horton, who was a childhood hero of his.

== Filmography ==
Year	Title	Role	Notes
1922	Too Much Business	John Henry Jackson	(film debut)
1922	The Ladder Jinx	Arthur Barnes	
1922	A Front Page Story	Rodney Marvin	
1923	Ruggles of Red Gap	Ruggles	Credited as Edward Horton
1923	The Vow of Vengeance		
1923	To the Ladies	Leonard Beebe	
1924	Flapper Wives	Vincent Platt	
1924	Try and Get It	Glenn Collins	
1924	The Man Who Fights Alone	Bob Alten	
1924	Helen's Babies	Uncle Harry	with Clara Bow and Baby Peggy
1925	Beggar on Horseback	Neil McRae	
1925	Marry Me	John Smith No. 2	
1925	The Business of Love	Edward Burgess	
1926	La Bohème	Colline	
1926	The Nutcracker	Horatio Slipaway	
1926	Poker Faces	Jimmy Whitmore	
1926	The Whole Town's Talking	Chester Binney	
1927	Taxi! Taxi!	Peter Whitby	
1927	No Publicity	Eddie Howard	silent short
1927	Find the King	Eddie Fairchild	silent short
1928	Dad's Choice	Eddie	silent short
1928	Behind the Counter	Eddie Baxter	silent short
1928	Horse Shy	Eddie Hamilton	silent short
1928	Scrambled Weddings	Eddie Howe	silent short
1928	Call Again	Eddie	silent short
1928	Vacation Waves	Eddie Davis	silent short
1928	The Terror	Ferdinand Fane	
1928	Miss Information	Representative	Vitaphone sound short
1929	Ask Dad	Dad	sound short
1929	The Eligible Mr. Bangs	Mr. Bangs	sound short
1929	The Right Bed	Bobby Kent	sound short
1929	Trusting Wives		sound short
1929	Prince Gabby		sound short
1929	Good Medicine		sound short
1929	Sonny Boy	Crandall Thorpe	
1929	The Hottentot	Sam Harrington	
1929	The Sap	The Sap	
1929	The Aviator	Robert Steele	
1930	Take the Heir	Smithers	
1930	Wide Open	Simon Haldane	
1930	Holiday	Nick Potter	
1930	Once a Gentleman	Oliver	
1930	Reaching for the Moon	Roger, the Valet	
1931	Kiss Me Again	René	Alternative title: Toast of the Legion
1931	Lonely Wives	Richard Smith / Felix, the Great Zero	
1931	The Front Page	Roy V. Bensinger	
1931	Six Cylinder Love	Monty Winston	
1931	Smart Woman	Billy Ross	
1931	The Age for Love	Horace Keats	
1932	But the Flesh Is Weak	Sir George Kelvin	
1932	Roar of the Dragon	Busby	
1932	Trouble in Paradise	François Filiba	
1933	Soldiers of the King	Sebastian Marvello	
1933	A Bedtime Story	Victor Dubois	
1933	It's a Boy	Dudley Leake	
1933	The Way to Love	Prof. Gaston Bibi	
1933	Design for Living	Max Plunkett	
1933	Alice in Wonderland	The Mad Hatter	
1934	Easy to Love	Eric	
1934	The Poor Rich	Albert Stuyvesant Spottiswood	
1934	Success at Any Price	Fisher	
1934	Uncertain Lady	Elliot Crane	
1934	Sing and Like It	Adam Frink, Producer	
1934	Smarty	Vernon	
1934	Kiss and Make-Up	Marcel Caron	
1934	Ladies Should Listen	Paul Vernet	
1934	The Merry Widow	Ambassador Popoff	
1934	The Gay Divorcee	Egbert Fitzgerald	
1935	Biography of a Bachelor Girl	Leander "Bunny" Nolan	
1935	The Night Is Young	Baron Szereny	
1935	All the King's Horses	Count Josef von Schlapstaat	
1935	The Devil Is a Woman	Gov. Don Paquito ("Paquitito")	
1935	$10 Raise	Hubert T. Wilkins	leading role
1935	In Caliente	Harold Brandon	
1935	Going Highbrow	Augie Winterspoon	
1935	Top Hat	Horace Hardwick	
1935	The Private Secretary	Reverend Robert Spalding	
1935	Little Big Shot	Mortimer	
1935	His Night Out	Homer B. Bitts	leading role
1935	Your Uncle Dudley	Dudley Dixon	leading role
1936	Her Master's Voice	Ned Farrar	leading role
1936	The Singing Kid	Davenport Rogers	
1936	Nobody's Fool	Will Wright	leading role
1936	Hearts Divided	John	
1936	The Man in the Mirror	Jeremy Dilke	dual role, lead
1936	Let's Make a Million	Harrison Gentry	leading role
1937	Lost Horizon	Alexander P. Lovett	
1937	The King and the Chorus Girl	Count Humbert Evel Bruger	
1937	Oh, Doctor	Edward J. Billop	leading role
1937	Shall We Dance	Jeffrey Baird	
1937	Wild Money	P.E. Dodd	leading role
1937	Danger – Love at Work	Howard Rogers	
1937	Angel	Graham	
1937	The Perfect Specimen	Mr. Grattan	
1937	The Great Garrick	Tubby	
1937	Hitting a New High	Lucius B. Blynn	
1938	Bluebeard's Eighth Wife	The Marquis De Loiselle	
1938	College Swing	Hubert Dash	
1938	Holiday	Professor Nick Potter	
1938	Little Tough Guys in Society	Oliver, butler	
1939	Paris Honeymoon	Ernest Figg	
1939	The Gang's All Here	Treadwell	
1939	That's Right—You're Wrong	Tom Village	
1941	You're the One	Death Valley Joe Frink	
1941	Ziegfeld Girl	Noble Sage	
1941	Sunny	Henry Bates	
1941	Bachelor Daddy	Joseph Smith	
1941	Here Comes Mr. Jordan	Messenger 7013	
1941	Week-End for Three	Stonebraker	
1941	The Body Disappears	Professor Shotesbury	
1942	The Magnificent Dope	Horace Hunter	
1942	I Married an Angel	Peter	
1942	Springtime in the Rockies	McTavish	
1943	Forever and a Day	Sir Anthony Trimble-Pomfret	
1943	Thank Your Lucky Stars	Farnsworth	
1943	The Gang's All Here	Peyton Potter	
1944	Her Primitive Man	Orrin	
1944	Summer Storm	Count "Piggy" Volsky	
1944	Arsenic and Old Lace	Mr. Witherspoon	
1944	San Diego, I Love You	Philip McCooley	
1944	Brazil	Everett St. John Everett	
1944	The Town Went Wild	Everett Conway	
1945	Steppin' in Society	Judge Avery Webster	
1945	Lady on a Train	Mr. Haskell	
1946	Cinderella Jones	Keating	
1946	Faithful in My Fashion	Hiram Dilworthy	
1946	Earl Carroll Sketchbook	Dr. Milo Edwards	
1947	The Ghost Goes Wild	Eric	
1947	Down to Earth	Messenger 7013	
1947	Her Husband's Affairs	J. B. Cruikshank	
1955	Max Liebman Presents: The Merry Widow	Baron Zelta	TV movie
1956	Saturday Spectacular: Manhattan Tower	Noah	TV movie
1957	The Story of Mankind	Sir Walter Raleigh	
1961	Pocketful of Miracles	Hudgins, butler	
1963	One Got Fat	Narrator	short subject
1963	It's a Mad, Mad, Mad, Mad World	Mr. Dinckler	
1964	Sex and the Single Girl	The Chief	
1967	The Perils of Pauline	Caspar Coleman	
1969	2000 Years Later	Evermore	
1971	Cold Turkey	Hiram C. Grayson (non-speaking role)	(final film role); released posthumously

== Partial television credits ==
Year	Title	Role	Episode(s)
1949	The Ford Theatre Hour (The Man Who Came to Dinner)	Sheridan Whiteside	1 episode
1952	I Love Lucy	Mr. Ritter	1 episode
1956	General Electric Theater	Mr. Parkinson	1 episode
1957	Playhouse 90	Mr. Carver	1 episode
1959–1964	The Adventures of Rocky and Bullwinkle and Friends	Narrator, Fractured Fairy Tales	All episodes
1960	The Real McCoys	J. Luther Medwick	1 episode
1962	Mr. Smith Goes to Washington	Senator Crabtree	1 episode
1962–1963	Dennis the Menace	Ned Matthews	3 episodes
1963	Our Man Higgins	Rawley	"Who's on First?" with Don Drysdale
1965	Burke's Law	Wilbur Starlington	1 episode
1965	F Troop	Roaring Chicken	6 episodes
1966	Batman	Chief Screaming Chicken	episodes 47 and 48
1969	It Takes a Thief	Lord Pelham-Gifford	1 episode
1970	Nanny and the Professor	Professor Clarendon	1 episode
1971	The Governor & J.J.	Doc Simon	2 episodes

== Radio appearances ==
Year	Program	Episode/source
1952	Musical Comedy Theater	On an Island with You

== Listen to ==
- Interview with Edward Everett Horton (January 8, 1940)
