= Garry Simpson =

American director, writer, and producer (1914–2011)

- Born: Garry Chalmers Simpson; February 16, 1914; Jackson, Mississippi, U.S.
- Died: November 19, 2011 (aged 97); Middlebury, Vermont, U.S.
- Education: Stanford University
- Occupations: Director, producer, writer
- Years active: 1938–1979
- Spouse: Kathleen McLean (m. 1940)
- Children: 4

Garry Chalmers Simpson (February 16, 1914 – November 19, 2011) was an American director, writer, and producer for more than 35 years.

Simpson was the first stage manager for NBC Television. He was also known for having directing credits on The Chevrolet Tele-Theatre, Four Star Revue, Armstrong Circle Theatre, and Mary Kay and Johnny, the first sitcom to be broadcast on network television.

== Early life and education ==
Simpson was born Garry Chalmers Simpson on February 16, 1914, in Jackson, Mississippi. He was born to parents Robert Edwin and Edna Simpson (née Hall). His father was an optometrist and his mother was an editor for the local newspaper. Simpson had three brothers; Vernon, Sidney, and Edwin.

His family moved from Jackson to Denver, Colorado when he was five years old. From there, his family moved to San Jose, California. He graduated from San Jose High School in 1932. After graduating high school, he served in the National Guard from 1932 to 1935 and became a corporal. He concluded his studies at Stanford University in 1938 with a Bachelor of Arts in English and drama.

== Career ==
Simpson first started out in show business as a performer. Initially headed to West Point Academy, Simpson wanted to pursue his passion of acting and writing. A screen test with Warner Bros. and radio work in San Francisco, led him to performing in summer stock with Olivia de Havilland in 1938. He was offered a scholarship to the Neighborhood Playhouse School of the Theatre in New York City, which he accepted - to the embarrassment of his family, refusing his appointment at West Point. It is reported that Havilland gave him $500 the night he left.

In 1939, Simpson was hired as an actor and director's assistant for the Globe Shakespearean Company at the New York World's Fair. After the fair closed, Simpson was hired by NBC as an announcer and model for closed-circuit experimental TV programs. He learned that RCA (who owned NBC) was hiring a promotional unit to demonstrate home TV receivers, a new phenomenon, in department stores across the country. Fascinated with this new technology, his job was to educate the public by creating and directing short entertainment presentations, staged and filmed on location. While auditioning local talent for demonstrations at the toy department of Marshall Field's in Chicago, he discovered puppeteer Burr Tillstrom, later leading to the TV show Kukla, Fran and Ollie. When the Federal Communications Commission finally granted permission for TV stations to broadcast, NBC promoted Simpson to the position of studio stage manager and director of mobile-unit special events.

He worked every show that was produced in the studio. He also directed sporting events and was assigned to supervise the film operations. Films comprised one-third of broadcast time and he was to select all feature films shown and edit them to fit the schedule. His career as a director took off.

Simpson went on to direct hundreds of television programs, sporting events and broadcasts, most notably, Wide Wide World, Armstrong Circle Theatre, Campbell's Soundstage, Ford Festival, The Danny Thomas Show, The Chevrolet Tele-Theatre, and Mary Kay and Johnny, the first sitcom broadcast on network television in the U.S. It was also the first time a couple was shown sharing a bed and a pregnancy on TV. He directed the first-ever broadcast of heavyweight boxing, baseball and horse racing. Other credits include such televised spectaculars from the Ringling Brothers Circus at Madison Square Garden, the Macy's Thanksgiving Day Parade, the Heisman Trophy Awards, President Truman delivering his NAACP speech at the Lincoln Memorial, and the infamous day at the United Nations when Russian Premier Nikita Khrushchev banged his shoe on his desk to make a point.

In addition he wrote and produced many commercials for ad agencies; Lucky Strike, Bell Telephone, Aqua Velva, and Jell-O.

In addition to his positions for NBC, he was a producer of programs for Scophony television, television director for RCA, stage manager for many Off-Broadway productions and the Globe Theatre. He was director of films for the U.S. Signal Corps and the Energy Commission, director of industrial shows for Depicto Films, General Motors, and Armstrong Cork. He also served as director of the Saratoga Summer Theatre, was a guest instructor at the American Theatre Wing, and produced Educational television programs on the Regents TV Project for the state of New York.

== Personal life ==
Simpson wed his wife Kathleen McLean on November 23, 1940. They met at the World's Fair a year earlier. They had four children together; Carolyn, Brian, John and Robin.

In 1979, Simpson retired from ETV and teaching at the University of Vermont, but he never rested. A new home was built in Ferrisburgh, Vermont near Lake Champlain. For the next 22 years he was active in the Charlotte, Vermont and Ferrisburgh Grange, Vergennes Rotary, gardening, and grand- children. In 1997, the Vergennes American Legion Post 14 honored him for his instrumental community service to the Bixby Library. Due to his wife's health complications, a move was made to the lodge at Shelburne Bay in Shelburne, Vermont and then the lodge at Otter Creek in Middlebury, Vermont where for over a decade he cared for her.

== Death ==
Simpson died on November 19, 2011, at his home in Middlebury, Vermont at the age of 97. He and his wife Kathleen had two sons and two daughters.
