= To the Ladies (film) =

1923 film by James Cruze

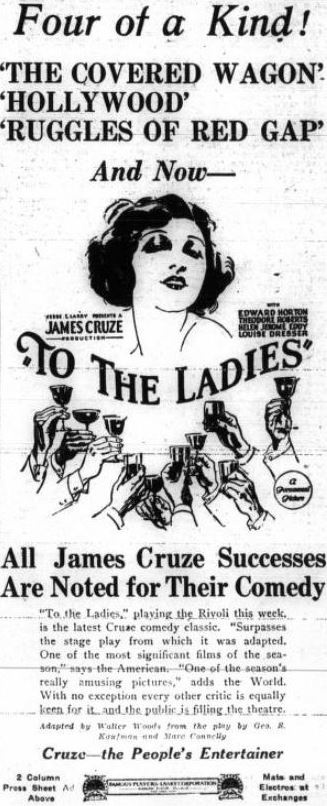
- Advertisement
- Directed by: James Cruze
- Written by: Walter Woods (scenario)
- Based on: To the Ladies by George S. Kaufman and Marc Connelly
- Produced by: Adolph Zukor; Jesse L. Lasky
- Starring: Edward Everett Horton; Theodore Roberts; Louise Dresser
- Cinematography: Karl Brown
- Distributed by: Paramount Pictures
- Release date: November 25, 1923
- Running time: 6 reels
- Country: United States
- Language: Silent (English intertitles)

To the Ladies is a 1923 American silent comedy film produced by Famous Players–Lasky and released by Paramount Pictures. It is based on a 1922 Broadway play, To the Ladies, by George S. Kaufman and Marc Connelly.

The film was directed by James Cruze and starred Edward Everett Horton, Theodore Roberts and Louise Dresser. Also in a bit part is young Mary Astor.

== Cast ==
- Edward Everett Horton as Leonard Beebe
- Theodore Roberts as John Kincaid
- Helen Jerome Eddy as Elsie Beebe
- Louise Dresser as Mrs. Kincaid
- Z. Wall Covington as Chester Mullin
- Arthur Hoyt as Tom Baker
- Jack Gardner as Bob Cutter
- Patricia Palmer as Mary Mullin
- Mary Astor as Bit

== Preservation status ==
This is now considered a lost film.
