= The Campbell Playhouse (TV series) =

- Also known as: Campbell Soundstage; TV Soundstage
- Directed by: Garry Simpson; Alex Segal; Marc Daniels
- Country of origin: United States
- Original language: English
- No. of seasons: 2
- No. of episodes: 51

Production
- Executive producer: Martin Horrell
- Producer: Martin Horrell
- Running time: 30 minutes

Original release
- Network: NBC
- Release: June 6, 1952 – September 3, 1954

The Campbell Playhouse (also known as Campbell Soundstage, TV Soundstage, and Campbell Summer Soundstage [summer hiatus only, see below]) is an American drama anthology television series that, in its various forms, originally aired on NBC from June 6, 1952, to September 3, 1954. The series was sponsored by the Campbell Soup Company.

== Radio series ==
The television series was based on the 1938–1940 radio series of the same name. The radio version was originally aired on CBS as The Mercury Theatre on the Air beginning July 11, 1938. The series made its last broadcast under that title on December 4, 1938. After that, the Campbell Soup Company sponsored the radio drama and renamed it The Campbell Playhouse. The Campbell Playhouse made its radio debut on December 9, 1938.

Orson Welles served as the host of the program.

The series offered 60-minute adaptations of famous novels and plays and, on certain occasions, adaptations of popular motion pictures of the time.

The radio program ended on March 31, 1940.

== Television series ==
=== Campbell Playhouse ===
The television version of Campbell Playhouse premiered on NBC on June 6, 1952, on Fridays from 9:30 to 10 p.m. Eastern Time as the summer replacement for The Aldrich Family. Filmed episodes included:

- "The Cavorting Statue" - Cesar Romero, Ann Rutherford
- "Return to Vienna" - Cameron Mitchell, Ruth Warrick
- *This Little Pig Cried" - Frances Rafferty, Robert Rockwell

=== Campbell Soundstage ===
In July 1953, the series (retitled Campbell Soundstage) returned as a permanent replacement series. (The Aldrich Family went off the air on May 29, 1953). It was broadcast live from New York and featured stories with surprise endings. This live version of the series ended its run on May 28, 1954, when it was replaced on June 4, 1954 with a filmed summer version, titled Campbell Summer Soundstage [see below].

The April 23, 1954, episode was "The Almighty Dollar" with Mildred Dunnock, Henry Hull, Mildred Natwick, and Parker Fennelly.

Other actors who starred in episodes included:

- James Dean
- Lillian Gish
- Brian Keith
- Jack Lemmon
- E. G. Marshall
- Walter Matthau
- Roddy McDowall
- Betsy Palmer

=== Campbell Summer Soundstage ===
On June 4, 1954, the name of the series was changed to Campbell Summer Soundstage. It reverted back to filmed episodes, some of which were reruns of episodes of Ford Theatre.

It was a short-lived revival of the television series. The series aired reruns of anthology series such as ABC's Gruen Playhouse, (later known as Gruen Guild Theatre), and DuMont's Dramatic Shorts.

=== Directors ===
- Garry Simpson
- Alex Segal
- Don Appell
- Marc Daniels
- Richard Irving
- Don Medford

=== Producers ===
- Martin Horrell (also served as executive producer)
- Marc Daniels (also served as associate producer)

== Broadcast history ==
Campbell Playhouse aired on Fridays at 9:30–10:00 pm for its entire run. Campbell Soundstage and Campbell Summer Soundstage aired at that time as well.
