= Marc Connelly =

American playwright (1890–1980)

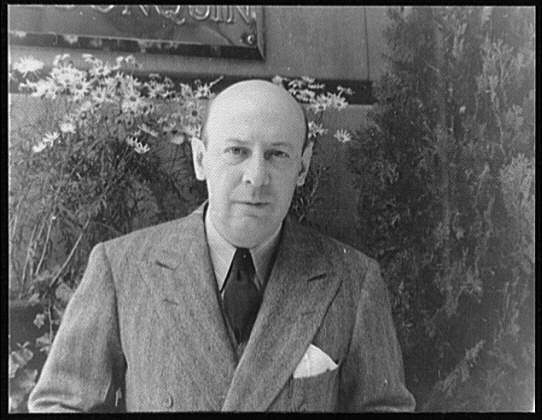
- photographed by Carl Van Vechten, 1937
- Born: Marcus Cook Connelly; December 13, 1890; McKeesport, Pennsylvania, US
- Died: December 21, 1980 (aged 90); New York City, US
- Occupations: Journalist; playwright; director; producer; performer, lyricist

Marcus Cook Connelly (December 13, 1890 – December 21, 1980) was an American playwright, director, producer, performer, and lyricist. He was a key member of the Algonquin Round Table, and received the Pulitzer Prize for Drama in 1930.

== Biography ==
Marcus Cook Connelly was born to actor and hotelier Patrick Joseph Connelly and actress Mabel Fowler Cook in McKeesport, Pennsylvania. His father died in 1902. Connelly attended Trinity Hall boarding school in Washington, Pennsylvania, after which he began collecting money for ads in The Pittsburgh Press to help to support his mother.

His initial newspaper job led to Connelly's working as an Associated Press cub reporter, after which he became a junior reporter for The Pittsburgh Gazette Times. Eventually he began writing a humor column for that newspaper. In 1919 he joined the Algonquin Round Table.

While he was working in Pittsburgh, Connelly ventured into writing for the stage, creating skits for shows put on by an athletic association and one-act plays for a little theater group. His interest in the theater increased after he began reporting on the theater beat for The Morning Telegraph in New York City. In that role he developed a friendship with George S. Kaufman, who wrote about drama for The New York Times.

Connelly had contributed to several Broadway musicals before teaming up with his most important collaborator, Kaufman, in 1921. During their four-year partnership, they wrote five comedies – Dulcy (1921), To the Ladies (1922), Merton of the Movies (1922), The Deep Tangled Wildwood (1923) and Beggar on Horseback (1924) – and also co-directed and contributed sketches to the 1922 revue The '49ers, collaborated on the book to the musical comedy Helen of Troy, New York (1923), and wrote both the book and lyrics for another musical comedy, Be Yourself (1924). His first solo drama was a comic fantasy called The Wisdom Tooth, which premiered on Broadway in February 1926.

Connelly received the Pulitzer Prize for Drama for The Green Pastures in 1930. The play, a re-telling of episodes from the Old Testament, was staged with the first all-black Broadway cast. He contributed verse and articles to Life, Everybody's, and other magazines.

Connelly was a drama teacher at Yale University from 1946 to 1950. In 1968, Connelly published his memoirs, Voices Offstage. Over the years, Connelly appeared as an actor in 21 movies, including The Spirit of St. Louis (1957) with James Stewart.

Connelly's television debut as an actor came in 1953 in an episode of Broadway TV Theatre on WOR-TV. A review in the trade publication Variety said that Connelly "handled himself with winning aplomb".

A film about the Round Table members, The Ten-Year Lunch (1987), won the Academy Award for Best Documentary Feature and featured Connelly, who was the last survivor. The 1994 film Mrs. Parker and the Vicious Circle, a fictional account of the group, featured actor Matt Malloy as Connelly.

Connelly died on December 21, 1980, in St. Luke's Hospital in Manhattan, aged 90.

== Filmography ==
Year	Title	Role	Notes
1920	The Sleep of Cyma Roget	Minor Role	
1957	The Spirit of St. Louis	Father Hussman	
1960	Tall Story	Prof. Charles Osman	
