= The Nuisance =

The Nuisance is the title of:

- The Nuisance (1921 film), a comedy short featuring Jimmy Aubrey, with Oliver Hardy
- The Nuisance (1933 film), a feature film starring Lee Tracy, Madge Evans and Frank Morgan
