= Dames and Dentists =

1920 film

- Directed by: Noel M. Smith
- Written by: Anthony Coldeway
- Produced by: Albert E. Smith
- Starring: Oliver Hardy
- Cinematography: Irving G. Ries
- Production company: Vitagraph Studios
- Distributed by: Vitagraph Studios
- Release date: January 19, 1920
- Country: United States
- Languages: Silent film English intertitles

Dames and Dentists is a 1920 American silent shot comedy film directed by Noel M. Smith featuring Jimmy Aubrey and Oliver Hardy.

== Plot ==
According to the copyright description, "After a novel awakening, the dentist leaves for his shop, where his assistant practices brainless dentistry until his arrival. A homewrecker in search of a job, seeks to flirt with various young ladies, end thinks he is rewarded when he sees the wife leaning out of her window. The dentist has trouble in his shop with the interference of the assistant, and the office is wrecked. The homewrecker calls on the wife, as does the assistant. They are caught in the room when the husband arrives. The wife hides the homewrecker in the closet, and the assistant in bed, while she pretends to be there but in reality is behind the bed. The husband jealously looks about the apartment for the gentleman caller and is about to give up the search when the homewrecker comes out garbed as a women. It would have been all right had not his hat and veil remained to the curtains, as he walked into the room. In the general mix-up that follows the assistant tries to escape and becomes involved. The wife knocks her husband unconscious by mistake, and the other two escape. The husband again seeks to beat them, and his wife is kidnapped by the homewrecker, who jumps in an auto and starts away. The husband and assistant get in a racing car. The husband falls off the car and is left behind by the assistant who pursues the homewrecker. The husband borrows a motor-cycle and speeds after them. He rescues his wife at last and they start happily for home in the borrowed motorcycle."

== Cast ==
- Jimmy Aubrey as The Husband
- Oliver Hardy (as Babe Hardy)
- Richard Smith

== Censorship ==
Before Dames and Dentists could be exhibited in Kansas, the Kansas Board of Review required the removal of a closeup of a girl shimmying in a dentist's chair, and a scene where it appears that a man and woman are in bed.

== See also ==
- List of American films of 1920
- Oliver Hardy filmography
