= The Decorator =

1920 film

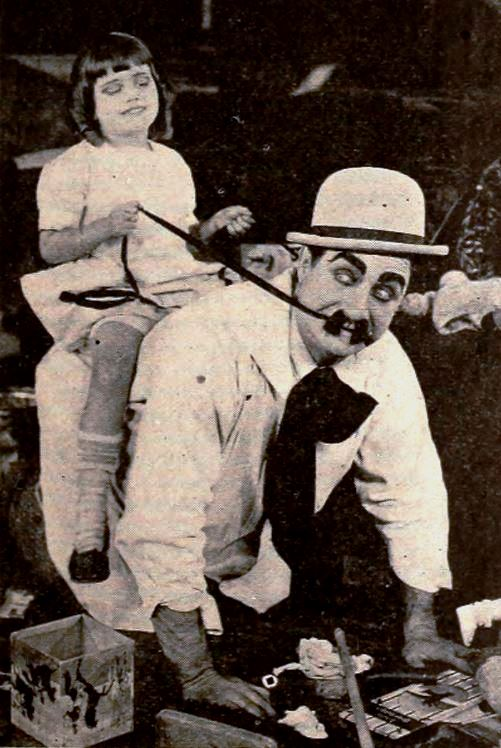
- Still with Jimmy Aubrey
- Directed by: Jess Robbins
- Written by: Jess Robbins
- Produced by: Albert E. Smith
- Starring: Oliver Hardy
- Cinematography: Irving G. Ries
- Production company: Jimmy Aubrey Productions Inc.
- Distributed by: Vitagraph Company of America
- Release date: September 4, 1920
- Running time: 2 reels
- Country: United States
- Language: Silent (English intertitles)

The Decorator is a 1920 American silent short comedy film directed by Jess Robbins and featuring Oliver Hardy.

== Plot ==
According to the copyright description, "Jimmy is called into decorate the home of the millionaire Babe. He stumbles about awkwardly wrecking the place, until Babe kicks him out. Babe leaves, and Jim, undaunted, takes possession of the house and begins his re-decorating. Meanwhile the rival has called and tried to bribe the cook to leave Babe. Jim upsets the rival several times causing him many discomfitures. The rival appeals to his chauffeur for aid. The girl, having thought the matter over, refuses to go with the rival, who tries to use force. Jimmy comes to her assistance. The millionaire returning, realizes what is taking place and goes after them. Jimmy rids the girl and himself of the rival and his chauffeur, and is being gratefully thanked by the girl, when Babe steps into the room. It is only then that Jimmy learns what relation the girl is to Babe, and why he guards her so jealously."

== Cast ==
- Jimmy Aubrey as Jimmy
- Oliver Hardy as Babe, a millionaire (credited as Babe Hardy)
- Kathleen Myers as The girl (credited as Catherine Myers)
- Jack Lloyd as Her sweetheart
- Evelyn Nelson

== See also ==
- List of American films of 1920
- Oliver Hardy filmography
