= China Slaver =

1929 film

- Directed by: Frank Mattison
- Screenplay by: Cecil Hill; L. V. Jefferson
- Story by: Calvin Holivey; Rupert Hughes
- Starring: Sôjin Kamiyama; Albert Valentino; Iris Yamaoka; Ben Wilson; Jimmy Aubrey; James Leong
- Cinematography: Jules Cronjager
- Edited by: Minnie Steppler
- Distributed by: Trinity Pictures
- Release date: January 25, 1929
- Country: United States
- Language: English

China Slaver is a 1929 American pre-Code action film produced by Trinity Pictures. Directed by Frank Mattison and written by Cecil Hill and L. V. Jefferson based on a story by Calvin Holivey and Rupert Hughes, the film features a cast that includes Sôjin Kamiyama, Albert Valentino, Iris Yamaoka, Ben Wilson, Jimmy Aubrey, and James Leong. The storyline involves a Chinese spy who is sent to infiltrate a remote island that is suspected to have become a hotbed of narcotics and white slavery under the rule of a tyrannical Chinese criminal. The film received generally lukewarm reviews from critics, although Sojin's performance in particular was praised.

== Cast ==
- Sôjin Kamiyama as Ming Foy/Wing Foy/The Cobra
- Albert Valentino as Mark Conover
- Iris Yamaoka (or Iris Shan) as Foo
- Ben Wilson as Sam Warren
- Jimmy Aubrey as Willie Kegg
- James Leong as Lee Mandarin

== Production ==
The project was first announced in December 1928, after Albert Valentino announced his participation in the film alongside Sojin; Trinity Pictures acquired distribution rights, with the film's release date set at January 25, 1929. Touting its noteworthy cast, the film was marketed as "the year's most exciting melodrama".

== Reception ==
A reviewer for Photoplay described China Slaver as a "rather ragged production attempting epical heights", but "handicapped by an overly-fantastic story and amateur direction." However, he also lauded Sojin for his "excellent" and "inscrutable" performance.
