= The Mysterious Stranger (1920 film) =

American silent short comedy film

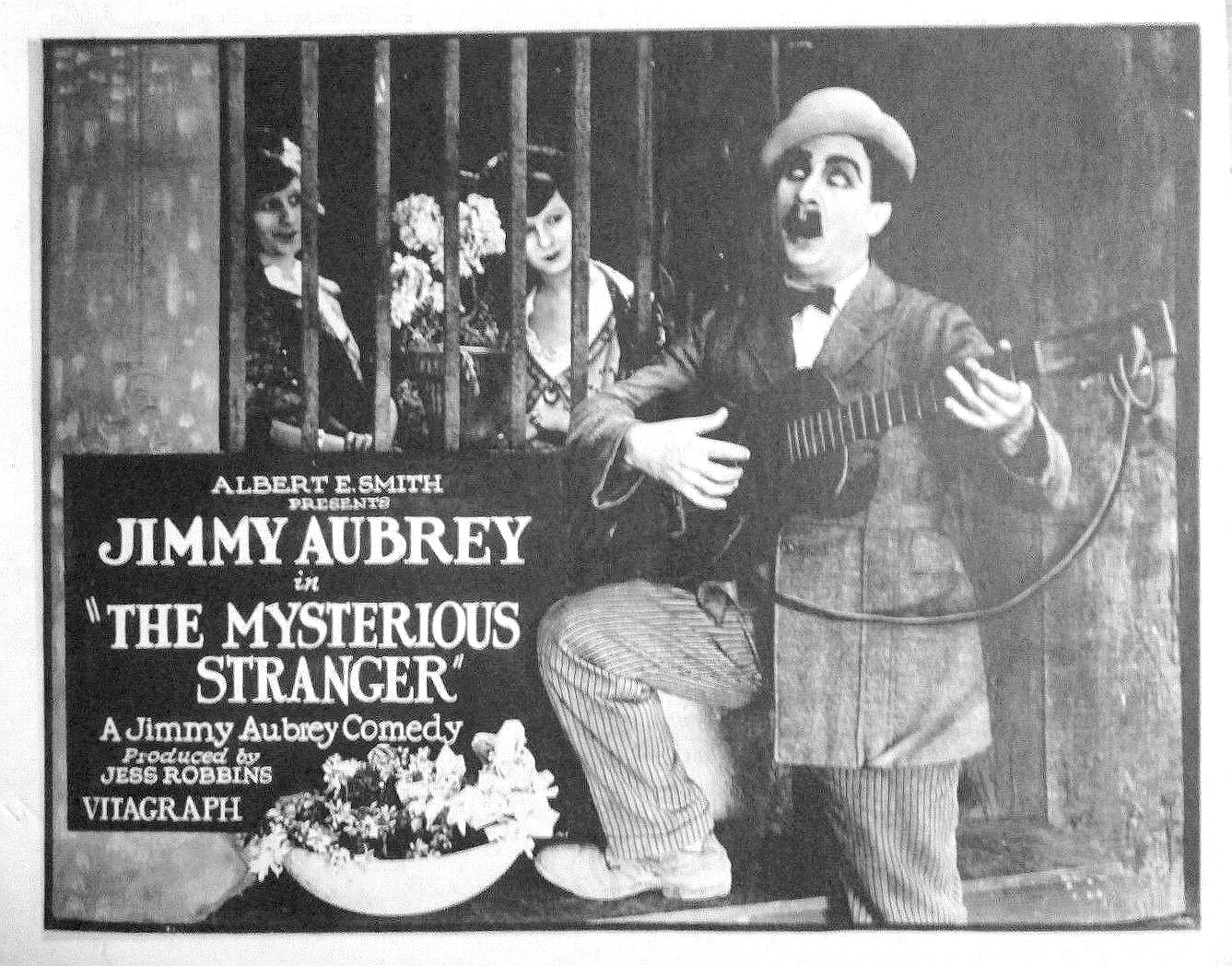
- Lobby card
- Directed by: Jess Robbins
- Written by: Jess Robbins
- Produced by: Albert E. Smith
- Starring: Oliver Hardy
- Production company: Jimmy Aubrey Productions Inc.
- Distributed by: Vitagraph Company of America
- Release date: December 1, 1920
- Running time: 2 reels
- Country: United States
- Language: Silent (English intertitles)

The Mysterious Stranger is a 1920 American silent short comedy film directed by Jess Robbins featuring Oliver Hardy.

== Plot ==
According to the copyright description, "Gayety and revolution keep things interesting in the quaint Spanish town. The favorite bull fighter is secretly planning a revolution. He is warned of a stranger, who is in reality a Federal spy. Into this atmosphere, Jimmy, the adventurer, comes, and amid many vicissitudes, reaches the inn. The rebels are certain he is the spy. He is trapped and thrown into prison. Instead of breaking rocks with the sledge, he hits the warden on the head. In the official's uniform he returns to tie tavern, and by saving the ladies from a mouse is the hero of the hour, much to the disgust of the toreador and his following. But before they can injure him after penetrating his disguise, a wild bull, which has been freed, enters the scene and all flee. The bull follows, and Jimmy, who doesn't know he's supposed to be frightened, mounts the animal with the girl, and rides through in triumph over both parties."

== Cast ==
- Jimmy Aubrey as The mysterious stranger
- Oliver Hardy as Toreador (credited as Babe Hardy)
- Maude Emory as Señorita
- Vincent McDermott as Cabbie

== See also ==
- List of American films of 1920
