= Minnie Steppler =

American film editor

- Born: Minnie Stewart; October 16, 1889; Ventura County, California, USA
- Died: March 30, 1964 (aged 74); Los Angeles County, California, USA
- Occupation: Film editor

Minnie Steppler (1889-1964) was an American film editor and occasional screenwriter active during the late 1920s.

== Biography ==
Minnie was born in Ventura County, California, to John Stewart and Sara Todd. She was married to Harry Steppler.

== Selected filmography ==
- Broken Hearted (1929)
- China Slaver (1929)
- Girls Who Dare (1929)
- The Candy Kid (1928)
- Must We Marry? (1928)
- The Little Wild Girl (1928)
- Old Age Handicap (1928)
