= Distilled Love =

1920 film

- Directed by: Vin Moore; Richard Smith
- Starring: Oliver Hardy
- Release date: April 1, 1920
- Country: United States
- Language: Silent (English intertitles)

Distilled Love is a 1920 American silent comedy film starring Alice Howell co-directed by Vin Moore and Richard Smith, and featuring Oliver Hardy, who was billed as "Babe Hardy" in this film.

== Cast ==
- Alice Howell as The Milkmaid
- Richard Smith as The Color Blind Artist (as Dick Smith)
- Oliver Hardy as Mr. Peeble Ford (billed as Babe Hardy)
- Billy Bevan
- Fay Holderness
- Ida Mae McKenzie
- Ray Godfrey as Diving Girl (as Rae Godfrey)

== Reception ==
The Film Daily gave it a mainly positive review on April 11, 1920, writing: "In addition to numerous touches in which common farmyard animals appear—bits of the sort that always appeal—there are several humorous bits in this two reeler that place it in the successful class of knock-about comedies. It is just a trifle disconnected, and may need cutting in places, but as a whole it is quite certain to register."

== See also ==
- List of American films of 1920
- Oliver Hardy filmography
