= Estelle Harrison =

American actress

- Born: Ruby Estelle Harrison; August 26, 1894; Florence, Alabama, USA
- Died: Unknown
- Occupation: Actress

Estelle Harrison was a silent actress during Hollywood's silent era. She primarily appeared in Gaylord Lloyd and Harold Lloyd shorts.

== Biography ==
Harrison was born Florence, Alabama, to Willis Harrison and Kate Hudson. When Harrison was young, the family moved to Los Angeles, where she and her siblings attended school.

Harrison was a Mack Sennett bathing beauty.

== Selected filmography ==
- Fighting Hearts (1922)
- A Knight of the West (1921)
- Dodge Your Debts (1921)
- A Zero Hero (1921)
- The Lucky Number (1921)
- His Jonah Day (1920)
- A Jazzed Honeymoon (1919)
- Pistols for Breakfast (1919)
- Si, Senor (1919)
- Ring Up the Curtain (1919)
- Just Dropped In (1919)
- She Loves Me Not (1918)
- No Place Like Jail (1918)
- Kicking the Germ Out of Germany (1918)
- It's a Wild Life (1918)
- Follow the Crowd (1918)
- On the Jump (1918)
- Here Come the Girls (1918)
- We Never Sleep (1917)
- Lonesome Luke Loses Patients (1917)
- Lonesome Luke's Wild Women (1917)
- Lonesome Luke, Mechanic (1917)
- Lonesome Luke's Honeymoon (1917)
- Luke Wins Ye Ladye Faire (1917)
- Lonesome Luke, Lawyer (1917)
- Luke's Movie Muddle (1916)
- Luke, Patient Provider (1916)
