= Noel M. Smith =

American film director (1895–1955)

- Born: May 22, 1894; Rockland, California, US
- Died: September 20, 1955 (aged 61); Los Angeles, California, US
- Occupation: Film director
- Years active: 1917–1952

Noel Mason Smith (May 22, 1895 – September 20, 1955) was an American film director and writer. He directed more than 120 films between 1917 and 1952. He was born in Rockland, California, and died in Los Angeles, California.

Noel Smith began his career in 1917 at Henry Lehrman's L-KO Kompany studio, making slapstick shorts. L-KO was notorious within the industry for making violent comedies that were unusually hazardous. This led him to move to Vitagraph, whose major star Larry Semon also favored large-scale action scenes. Smith and Semon worked closely, writing and staging elaborate visual gags. This experience influenced Smith so heavily that he became known as an action director, capable of staging impressive, stunt-filled scenes on quick shooting schedules. In the mid-1920s he made the short-subject Century Comedies, released by Universal Pictures.

In 1936 Warner Bros. launched a series of "singing cowboy" westerns to compete with the Gene Autry features sweeping the country. The studio selected Dick Foran to star. In order to make the series as economically as possible, the Foran films borrowed action footage from Warners' John Wayne westerns of 1932–33. Noel Smith was hired to film the new scenes, and this led to a steady string of low-budget assignments for the studio. Some of these films were remakes of older Warner features, saving more money because the stories were already prepared. Smith was usually called upon to direct the last film in a fading series, so it could be finished quickly and cheaply. Smith concluded Warners' Brass Bancroft series, Dead End Kids series, and Torchy Blane series.

Warners did not renew Smith's contract when the studio reduced B-picture production in 1941. He came back to Universal, where he rushed through an exploitation feature about America's entry into war (Burma Convoy, 1941). His second and last Universal project was Gang Busters (1942), the studio's bid to make serials for adult audiences, and Noel Smith made valuable contributions by staging many reckless action sequences. This was to be his last film until five years later, when the independent Eagle-Lion studio hired him as a second-unit director to film scenes for the outdoor adventure The Red Stallion. Smith continued to do second-unit work for the next few years.

Finally, in 1952, Smith returned to Warner Bros., where studio chief Jack L. Warner wanted to terminate actor Dennis Morgan's expensive contract. Warner remembered Noel Smith as a fast-and-cheap director, and hired him to make a quickie western with Morgan, Cattle Town. Warner was certain that Morgan would refuse the assignment and break the contract, but Morgan reported for work as scheduled and made the film for Smith.

Noel Smith then retired from the industry permanently, and died three years later at the age of 61.

== Selected filmography ==
- Tootsies and Tamales (1919)
- Healthy and Happy (1919)
- Yaps and Yokels (1919)
- Mates and Models (1919)
- Squabs and Squabbles (1919)
- Bungs and Bunglers (1919)
- Switches and Sweeties (1919)
- Dames and Dentists (1920)
- Maids and Muslin (1920)
- Squeaks and Squawks (1920)
- The Girl in the Limousine (1924)
- Her Boy Friend (1924)
- Kid Speed (1924)
- The Clash of the Wolves (1925)
- The Flying Mail (1926)
- The Night Patrol (1926)
- The Merry Cavalier (1926)
- The Blue Streak (1926)
- Fangs of Justice (1926)
- The Snarl of Hate (1927)
- One Chance in a Million (1927)
- Marlie the Killer (1928)
- Fangs of Fate (1928)
- The Law's Lash (1928)
- The Bachelor's Club (1929)
- Dancing Dynamite (1931)
- Scareheads (1931)
- The Fighting Pilot (1935)
- Guns of the Pecos (1936, first for Warner Bros.)
- The Cowboy Quarterback (1939)
- Code of the Secret Service (1939)
- On Dress Parade (1939)
- Secret Service of the Air (1939)
- Torchy Blane... Playing with Dynamite (1939)
- The Nurse's Secret (1941)
- Gang Busters (serial, 1942)
- Cattle Town (1952)
