= Yaps and Yokels =

1919 film

- Directed by: Noel M. Smith
- Written by: Noel M. Smith
- Produced by: Albert E. Smith
- Starring: Oliver Hardy
- Production company: Vitagraph Studios
- Distributed by: Vitagraph Studios
- Release date: September 1, 1919
- Country: United States
- Languages: Silent film English intertitles

Yaps and Yokels is a 1919 American silent short comedy film directed by Noel M. Smith, featuring Jimmy Aubrey and Oliver Hardy.

== Plot ==
According to the copyright description, "Chickens, the girl, her male parent, and the hired man are all introduced in novel manners. James, rousing from his bed in the river, makes his way to the farm, and is making love to the girl when the hired man discovers him. He hides under the hay. The hired man, to conceal his jealousy and rage, pretends to be playfully digging his fork in the hay, thinking he is torturing James - when he is surprised to see a tramp stand up, shake himself free of the hay and after complaining of the treatment he received, walk away. The hired man is dumbfounded, to turn in time to see James with the girl. James is questioned, and invited to stay. In due course of time, James becomes the Gunga Dhin of the farm. He causes the farmer to chase him. Is caught in the threshing machine and becomes tied in one of the bales. He starts the hay burning, running around the farm scaring the help, and finally setting fire to a dynamite factory.

The men are reminded of the girl's birthday, and each one brings his present to her. The hired hand brings a huge basket of flowers, from which emerges James. He plans to elope with the girl, is overheard by "the wall flower" who is greatly smitten with him [illegible] her around the corner. The father hears both, and after binding the girl in a closet, dons her clothes and meets the hired men himself. The "wall flower" pretending to be the girl, meets James. Both couples rush to the parsons, and discover the deception played on them. They rush back to the house to get the girl, who having removed her bonds, had started out to join them. In the midst of the rejoicing of James and the hired man, her real sweetheart returns from the front, and she leaves both to go with him."

== Cast ==
- Jimmy Aubrey as James
- Oliver Hardy as The Hired Hand (as Babe Hardy)
- Richard Smith as The Father (as Dick Smith)

== Censorship ==
Before Yaps and Yokels could be exhibited in Kansas, the Kansas Board of Review required the removal of a scene where a hen lays an egg and it falling on a fat child's head.

== See also ==
- List of American films of 1919
- Oliver Hardy filmography
