= Jazz and Jailbirds =

1919 film

- Directed by: J. A. Howe
- Written by: J. A. Howe
- Produced by: Albert E. Smith
- Starring: Oliver Hardy
- Cinematography: R. D. Armstrong
- Production company: Vitagraph Studios
- Distributed by: Vitagraph Studios
- Release date: March 24, 1919
- Country: United States
- Languages: Silent film English intertitles

Jazz and Jailbirds is a 1919 American silent short comedy film featuring Oliver Hardy.

== Plot ==
According to the copyright description, "At the Come On Inn, Jimmy, the waiter, is sweet on Mlle. Twinkletoes. The manager interferes, and Jimmy leads him to believe that it was all part of the act, his loving Mlle. Twinkletoes. I.M. Ruff, warden of the jail, arrives with two of the Ruff family - and Jimmy is assigned to attend him. Through much carelessness and vengeance, Jimmy is finally forced to apologize to the warden. While he is doing so, the Count De Razzbury, picks the warden's pocket book from his pocket, and then, fearing detection, slips it into Jimmy's pocket. Jimmy is arrested - his explanations scoffed at. He is taken to prison. Mr. Ruff and his wife plan a reception, and Mlle. Twinkletoes is hired for the occasion. Count De Razzbury, the guest of honor, accepts the invitation, much to Miss Ruff's steady company's jealousy. While the warden is taking his morning exercise with the convicts, Jimmy manages by a ruse to escape, meets "the steady company" who invites him to take the place of the distinguished guest, and Jimmy does so. Upon being presented to Mr. Ruff, Jimmy receives reminders of the Hoosegow, and the warden suspects but is not sure, and later, when Jimmy's disguise ''slips" he recognizes his naked face. Mlle. Twinkletoes confesses to Jimmy's innocence - and Ruff believing, promises a $1000 could he but right the wrong. Jimmy, although badly beaten after his encounter with Ruff, comes to, and grabs the money before Buff can take back is offer."

== Cast ==
- Jimmy Aubrey as Jimmy
- Oliver Hardy as I.M. Ruff (as Babe Hardy)
- Richard Smith as Thief (as Dick Smith)
- Dorothy Vernon
- Dorothea Wolbert
- Jess Weldon as Fat Man

== See also ==
- List of American films of 1919
- Oliver Hardy filmography
