= Switches and Sweeties =

1919 film

- Directed by: Noel M. Smith
- Written by: Anthony W. Coldeway
- Produced by: Albert E. Smith
- Starring: Jimmy Aubrey; Babe Hardy; Dick Smith
- Production company: Big V Special Comedies
- Distributed by: Big V Special Comedies
- Release date: December 22, 1919
- Running time: 2 reels; 1,969 metres
- Country: United States
- Languages: Silent; English intertitles

Switches and Sweeties is a 1919 American silent short comedy film featuring Oliver Hardy (credited as Babe Hardy).

== Plot ==
According to the copyright description, "The janitor of the beauty parlor was discovered to be two faced by his wife who knew his habits. His wife conducted a gymnastic class directly off the beauty parlor. The chief of police and his sergeant take an interest in the doings of the beauty parlor. The former chief jealous, keeps a suspicious eye on the chief and plans revenge. He plants a bomb in a beautiful bouquet which he gives to the janitor to deliver. The janitor in turn hands it to the sergeant, who wishing to make a good impression on the chief, presents it as his own gift. The chief hears the time-bomb and accuses the sergeant who confesses that he received it from the janitor. The two are thrown into jail. Then follows the doings at the jail, the military training of the prisoners, etc. Accused by the Prison Reform Committee of ill-treatment to the prisoners, the chief decides to present them with an entertainment. The entertainment brings about the chief's downfall, the janitor's promotion to the chief's place, and the congratulations of the committee."

== Cast ==
- Jimmy Aubrey as a janitor
- Babe Hardy
- Dick Smith

== See also ==
- List of American films of 1919
- Oliver Hardy filmography
