= Mates and Models =

1919 film

- Directed by: Noel M. Smith
- Written by: Anthony Coldeway
- Produced by: Albert E. Smith
- Starring: Oliver Hardy
- Release date: September 29, 1919
- Country: United States
- Languages: Silent film English intertitles

Mates and Models is a 1919 American silent comedy film featuring Oliver Hardy.

== Plot ==
According to the copyright description, "Hubby tries to mix love with housekeeping, much to his wife’s disgust. He finds it rather hard work cooking and scrubbing, while wifey ungratefully flirts with the nutty artist across the hall, and the other rival artist. Some models arrive to pose for the artists, and the two squabble over who is to have them. Hubby leaves, telling wifey he expects to find her alone when he returns. He becomes involved in the trouble over the models, finally getting thrown out of the studio. Meanwhile, wifey has sent for the plumber, who arrives with his valet. Hubby returns, in time to see first one artist, and then another pass out of his home, followed by the plumber and his valet. He accuses the plumber of being a wife-stealer, and the plumber beats him up. Wifey returns, recognizes her brother in the plumber, and there is a happy reunion. Hubby coming back, is introduced to the brother. The rival artist forges a letter supposed to come from wifey's uncle, in order to get rid of her husband. Receiving the letter, wifey believes that by divorcing her husband she will receive the five thousand dollars. They plan to separate, collect the money and then remarry. With the aid of the nutty artist across the hall, who secures the help of one of his models, the frame-up is worked, Nutty Artist and Wifey run off for the divorce. Seeking witnesses, the plumber is told to look. He recognizes the husband with the girl, and goes in and beats him up. Meantime the nutty artist and the girl have received the divorce papers, and returning, bring a minister with them. Wifey arrives in the midst of the beating, rescues hubby and the situation is cleared up, when the plumber insists on hubby marrying the girl, by his valet claiming her as his wife. Hubby and wifey are re-married, to the discomfiture of the two artists."

== Cast ==
- Jimmy Aubrey as The Husband
- Oliver Hardy as A Nutty Artist (as Babe Hardy)
- Richard Smith as A Rival Artist (as Dick Smith)
- Maude Emory as The Wife

== Censorship ==
Initially, the film was rejected in its entirety by the Kansas Board of Review, but was reviewed again where it passed with cuts. The scenes removed were of a crawling snake, a fat man doing the shimmy, and shortened the scene of a half-nude girl posing in a studio.

== See also ==
- List of American films of 1919
- Oliver Hardy filmography
