= His Jonah Day =

1920 film

- Directed by: Jess Robbins
- Written by: Jess Robbins
- Produced by: Albert E. Smith
- Starring: Oliver Hardy
- Production company: Vitagraph Studios
- Distributed by: Vitagraph Studios
- Release date: November 1920
- Country: United States
- Languages: Silent film English intertitles

His Jonah Day is a 1920 American silent short comedy film featuring Oliver Hardy.

== Plot ==
According to the copyright description, "At the fashionable beach in front of Hotel Catherine, Catalina, Jimmy gets an eyeful of the beauties aided by powerful binoculars. He slips - on a banana peel, right into a romance with a beautiful nursemaid, but this is interrupted when he falls off the pier in the midst of their conversation. The giant life saver is prevailed upon to get his suit wet by saving Jimmy by the bewitching maid. He saves all of Jimmy except his hat. As the life saver pumps water out of Jimmy, it saturates a maiden lady and her niece and ruins the former's dress. To add to his popularity with the spinster, he seeks to rescue her from a fish which has slipped down her dress. His efforts succeed only in precipitating the elderly lady off the pier for a thirty foot dive into the ocean. When she gets back on the pier, she delivers an excellent drubbing to Jimmy knocking him senseless on the pier. Two escaping robbers leap into a fast motorboat and speed away, their mooring line dragging the baby carriage with them. Jimmy leaps on the back of a passing whale, which swallows him. He escapes, however, and rescues the small boy from an octopus. In the midst of the battle he awakes to find that the youngster had wrapped him in tangles of rope as he lay unconscious. His efforts to steal the nursemaid from the life saver are thwarted and Jimmy finds himself once more, in the water, with little chance of being rescued."

== Cast ==
- Jimmy Aubrey as The tourist
- Oliver Hardy as The life saver (as Babe Hardy)
- Evelyn Nelson as The girl
- Rosa Gore as Her maiden aunt
- Estelle Harrison as The nursemaid
- Jack Lloyd as Fisherman
- George Fox as The grouch

== See also ==
- List of American films of 1920
- Oliver Hardy filmography
