= Glorious Betsy =

1928 film

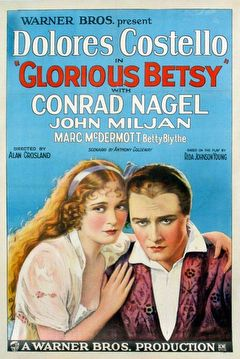
- 1928 theatrical poster
- Directed by: Alan Crosland; Gordon Hollingshead
- Screenplay by: Anthony Coldeway; Jack Jarmuth
- Based on: Glorious Betsy; 1908 play by Rida Johnson Young
- Starring: Dolores Costello; Conrad Nagel
- Cinematography: Hal Mohr
- Edited by: Thomas Pratt
- Production company: Warner Bros. Pictures
- Distributed by: Warner Bros. Pictures
- Release date: April 26, 1928
- Running time: 80 minutes (8 reels; 7,091 feet)
- Country: United States
- Languages: Sound (Part-Talkie); English Intertitles
- Budget: $198,000
- Box office: $965,000

Glorious Betsy is a 1928 sound part-talkie drama film. In addition to sequences with audible dialogue or talking sequences, the film features a synchronized musical score and sound effects along with English intertitles. The soundtrack was recorded using the Vitaphone sound-on-disc system. The film is based on the 1908 play of the same name by Rida Johnson Young, and it stars Dolores Costello. It was produced by Warner Bros. and nominated for an Academy Award for Best Writing, Adaptation in 1929. The film was directed by Alan Crosland with cinematography by Hal Mohr.

A mute print of this sound film survives in the Library of Congress. The Vitaphone soundtrack discs, which are needed to restore the sound to the film, may exist in private hands but are not currently known to exist at any archive. Vitaphone track survives complete apart from the sound disc to reel 5 at UCLA Film & Television Archive.

Although the film was written by both Anthony Coldeway and Jack Jarmuth (the latter credited only for title cards); only Coldeway was nominated for the Academy Award.

The 1961 Warner Bros. film Splendor in the Grass features a scene in which Bud Stamper (Warren Beatty) and his friends watch the film in a theater.

== Plot ==
Elizabeth “Glorious Betsy” Patterson falls in love with Jerome, her French tutor. When her father, Colonel Patterson, informs her that the brother of Napoleon will be attending a ball in Baltimore, Jerome secretly writes to Betsy asking for a moment alone. She meets him, and he pleads for her hand in marriage. Betsy accepts.

At the ball, Captain Bonaparte is announced—and Betsy realizes that her lover is Napoleon's brother. They marry immediately. Soon after, Jerome receives word that Napoleon wants him to return to France to wed Princess Fredericka of Wurtemberg.

Betsy and Jerome travel to France, but the Emperor refuses to recognize their marriage, denying Betsy the right to set foot on French soil. Jerome swears he will never enter France without his wife. Napoleon privately convinces Betsy that if she truly loves Jerome, she must give him up for the good of France. Betsy bids him goodbye “until tomorrow,” knowing it is forever.

In Baltimore, months later, a despairing Betsy gives birth to a son. Jerome, on his way to be wed to the princess, escapes his carriage and returns to America. He and Betsy are reunited, while their baby gurgles contentedly in his cradle.

== Cast ==
- Dolores Costello as Betsy Patterson
- Conrad Nagel as Jérôme Bonaparte
- John Miljan as Preston
- Marc McDermott as Colonel Patterson
- Pasquale Amato as Napoleon Bonaparte
- Michael Vavitch as Capt. St. Pierre
- Andrés de Segurola as Capt. Du Fresne
- Paul Panzer as The Ship's Captain
- Clarissa Selwynne as Aunt Mary
- Betty Blythe as Princess Frederick

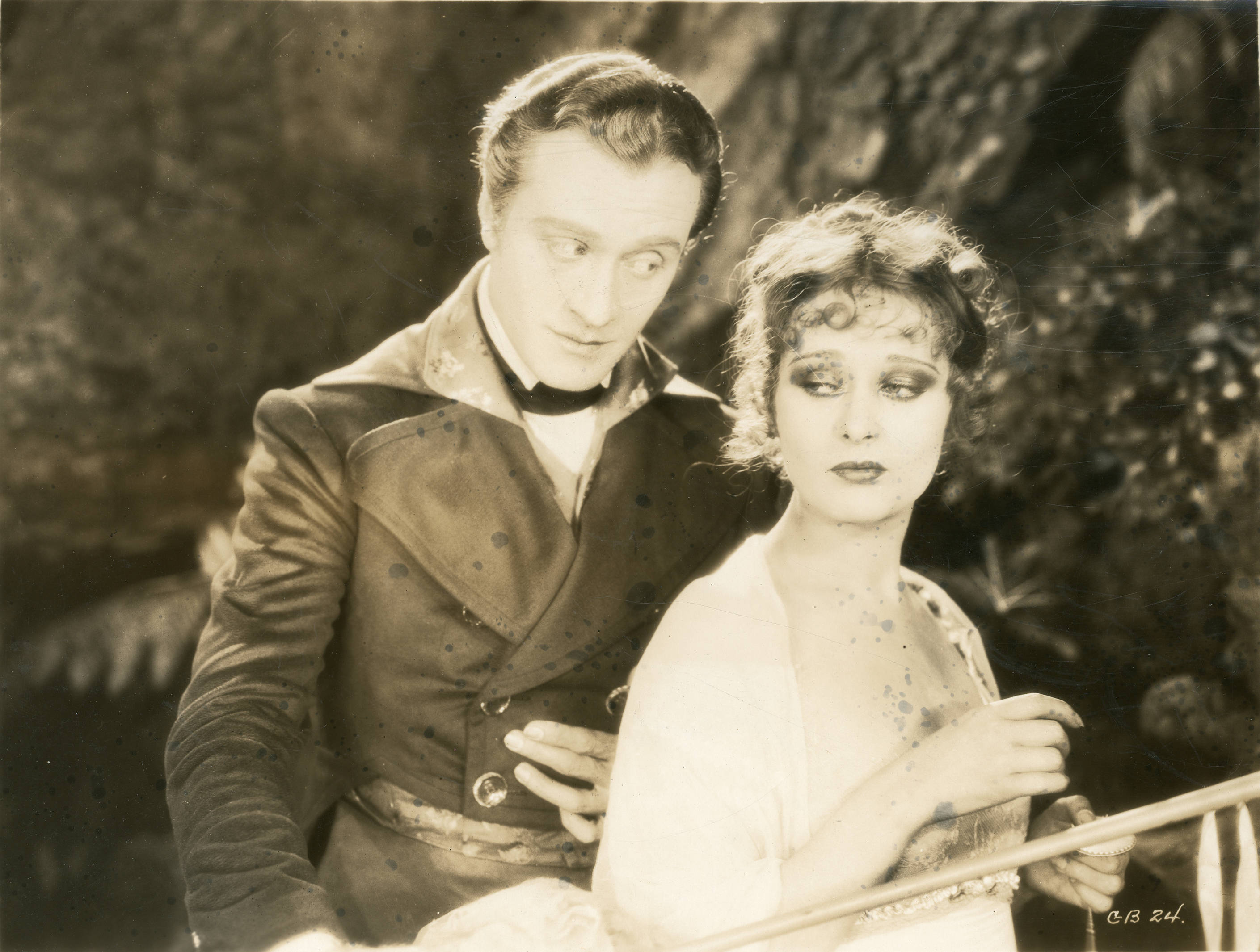
Still from the movie

== Production ==
The film is based on the 1908 Broadway play written by Rida Johnson Young and starring Mary Mannering. It was produced by Lee and Jake Shubert, and opened at the Lyric Theatre on September 7, 1908. It only ran 24 performances and closed in September 1908. Future film players Charles Clary, Harrison Ford, and Maude Turner Gordon had roles in the production.

== Premiere Vitaphone short films ==
Glorious Betsy premiered at Warners Theatre in Los Angeles on April 26, 1928.

Title	Year
Marion Talley, Soprano, and Beniamino Gigli, Tenor, of the Metropolitan Opera Company, Singing "Verranno a te sull'aura" (Borne on the Sighing Breeze) from Act 1 of Lucia di Lammermoor	1927

== Box office ==
According to records at Warner Bros., the film earned $815,000 in the U.S. and $153,000 in other markets.

== See also ==
- List of early sound feature films (1926–1929)
- List of early Warner Bros. talking features
