= The Tourist (1921 film) =

1921 film

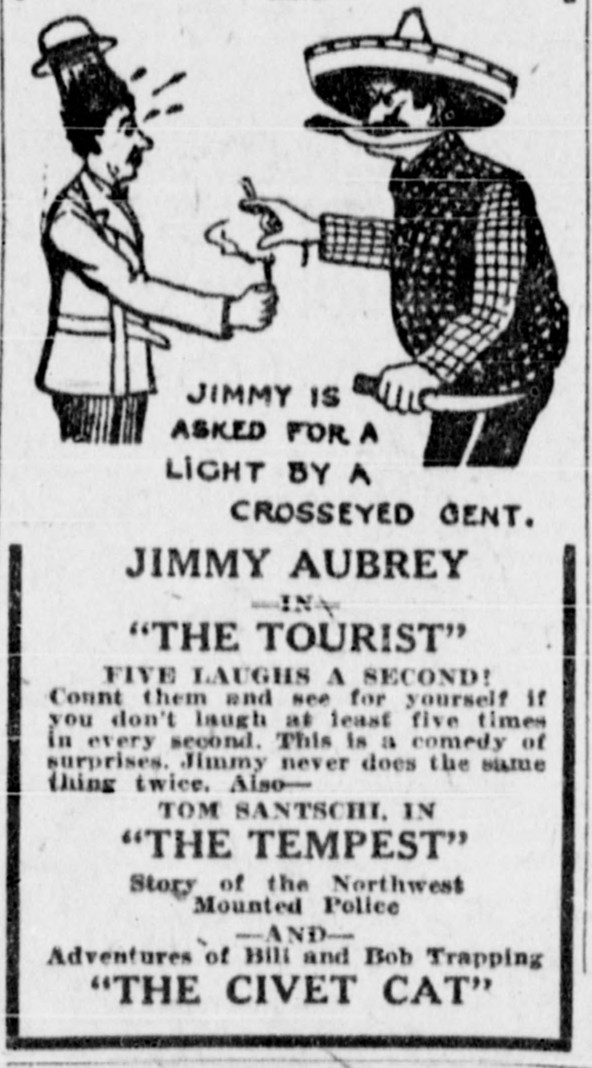
- Newspaper advertisement
- Directed by: Jess Robbins
- Written by: Jess Robbins
- Produced by: Albert E. Smith
- Starring: Oliver Hardy
- Release date: June 13, 1921
- Country: United States
- Languages: Silent film English intertitles

The Tourist is a 1921 American silent comedy film directed by Jess Robbins and starring Oliver Hardy.

== Plot ==
According to the copyright description, "When the cross country stage is held up by outlaws, Jimmy's antics prompt the bandits to take him with them, when they insist on taking the bag of "hops" for safety, Jimmy makes his appearance, escapes and runs into a huge redwood tree, knocking it over on himself and hitting the chief of the gang. He visions beautiful woodland nymphs, led by a very fat nymph, and when he comes to his senses he finds the ugly bandits in their places. He shins up a tall tree to escape them but is roped and the tree bends over by the combined efforts of the bandits. He cuts the rope and the spring of the bowed tree hurls him far out into an emigrant prairie schooner. They race with the bandits, whom Jimmy unhorses one by one, by throwing the supply of food into their faces. Safe in camp at last, Jimmy is about to be well fed by the daughter, with whom he is making progress. He is interrupted in his wooing by the appearance of the bandits. They are scared away however, and so is the girl. Trying to embrace, her he finds instead of her a huge bear, Jimmy leaves the neighborhood and his new romance in a hurry."

== Cast ==
- Jimmy Aubrey as The tourist
- Oliver Hardy as Leader of the outlaws (as Babe Hardy)
- Zella Ingraham

== See also ==
- List of American films of 1921
