= When Knights Were Cold =

1923 film

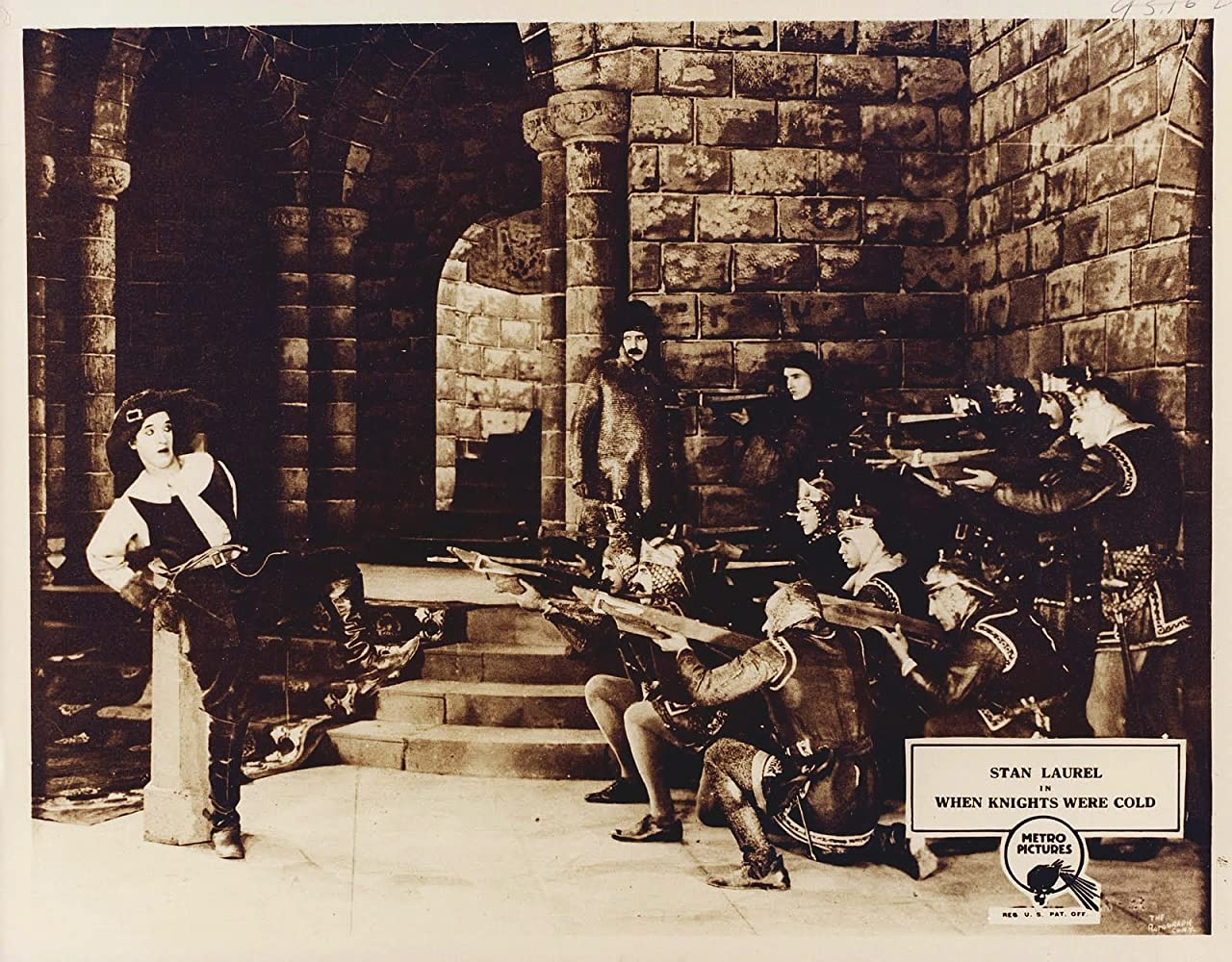
- Lobby card
- Directed by: Frank Fouce
- Written by: Tom Miranda
- Produced by: Broncho Billy Anderson
- Starring: Stan Laurel
- Cinematography: Irving G. Ries
- Production company: Quality Film Productions
- Distributed by: Metro Pictures Corporation
- Release date: February 12, 1923
- Running time: 20 minutes
- Country: United States
- Language: Silent (English intertitles)

When Knights Were Cold (1923)

When Knights Were Cold is a 1923 American silent comedy film directed by Frank Fouce starring Stan Laurel.

== Cast ==
- Stan Laurel as Lord Helpus, a Slippery Knight
- Mae Laurel as Countess Out, a Classy Eve
- Catherine Bennett as Princess Elizabeth New Jersey, a Swell Eve
- Scotty MacGregor as Sir Chief Raspberry, a Rough Knight
- Billy Armstrong as Earl of Tabasco, a Hot Knight (credited as William Armstrong)
- Will Bovis as Duke of Sirloin, a Tough Knight
- Stanhope Wheatcroft as Prince of Pluto, a Bad Knight
- Harry De More as King Epsom, a Good Knight
- Dot Farley (uncredited)

== See also ==
- List of American films of 1923
