= The Business of Love =

1925 film

- Directed by: Irving Reis; Jess Robbins
- Written by: Ford Beebe
- Starring: Edward Everett Horton; Barbara Bedford; ZaSu Pitts
- Cinematography: Irving Reis
- Production company: Principal Pictures
- Distributed by: Astor Pictures
- Release date: August 7, 1925
- Running time: 60 minutes
- Country: United States
- Languages: Silent; English intertitles

The Business of Love is a 1925 American silent comedy film directed by Irving Reis and Jess Robbins and starring Edward Everett Horton, Barbara Bedford, and ZaSu Pitts.

== Plot ==
As described in a film magazine review, a young man educated for the law derives so much more pleasure from tinkering with clocks and radios that he falls from his rich uncle's graces. On one of his repairing exDeditions he meets and is attracted to the daughter of an inventor. When he learns that the man selected by his uncle as the other member of the law firm of which he presumably is a member, is plotting to swindle the inventor, he schemes against the schemer. Finally, he is successful both in breaking the plot and in wooing the inventor's daughter.

== Cast ==
- Edward Everett Horton as Edward Burgess
- Barbara Bedford as Barbara Richmond
- ZaSu Pitts as Miss Wright
- Tom Ricketts as Noah Burgess
- Dorothy Wood as Inez Scarborough
- Carl Stockdale as James Scarborough
- Tom Murray as Sweeney
- James T. Kelley as Martin Block
- Stanley Taylor as Willis Graves
- Newton Hall as Bobby
- Herbert Sherwood as Mullins
- Jim MacIntyre as Bluett

== Preservation ==
In February 2021, The Business of Love was cited by the National Film Preservation Board on their Lost U.S. Silent Feature Films list and is therefore presumed lost.

== Bibliography ==
- Munden, Kenneth White. The American Film Institute Catalog of Motion Pictures Produced in the United States, Part 1. University of California Press, 1997.
