= Mules and Mortgages =

1919 film

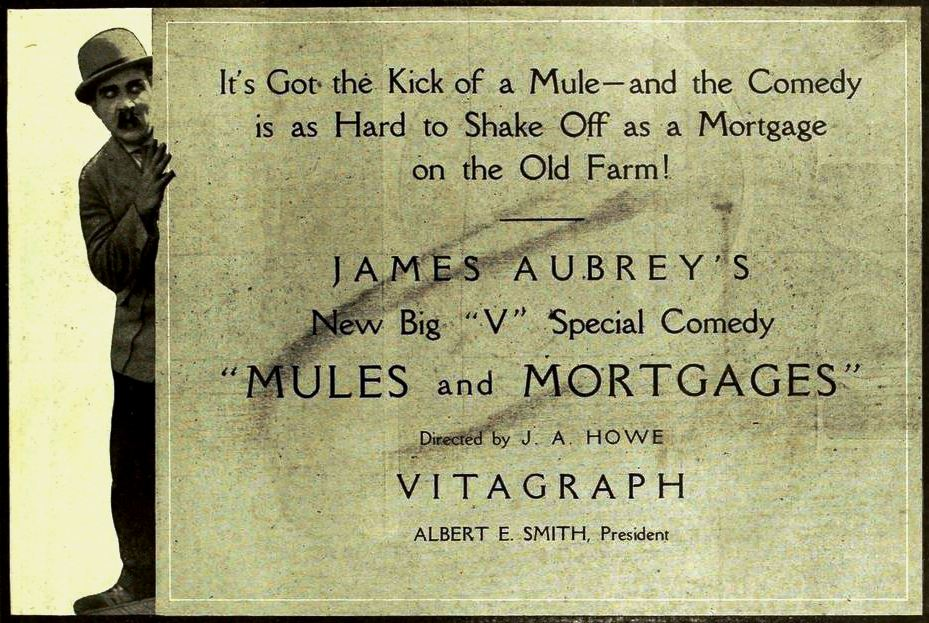
- Ad for film
- Directed by: J. A. Howe
- Written by: J. A. Howe
- Produced by: Albert E. Smith
- Starring: Jimmy Aubrey; Oliver Hardy
- Cinematography: R. D. Armstrong
- Release date: April 21, 1919
- Country: United States
- Language: Silent (English intertitles)

Mules and Mortgages is a 1919 American silent short comedy film featuring Oliver Hardy.

== Plot ==
According to the copyright description, "Old man Hardscratch, the village nickel-nurser, a hard-hearted mortgage taxer, gives notice to the heroine and her people that unless they pay, he will put them into the street. The girl appeals to Jim for help, Strongarm, the blacksmith, brings Jim to his shop as his apprentice, Strongarm receives a present from his partner Gideon, with a letter, - the trained monkey, Minnie, Minnie gives Strongarm and Jim a chase about - while she sits on the roof of the shop and watches them, Strongarm leaves the shop in Jim's care - and during his absence Jim "shoes" a horse and receives two dollars from the owner for his work. With this money he buys milk for the hungry baby, the old man Hardscratch having refused to give it to the girl. The mean old man Hardscratch, while taking something from his pocket, accidentally drops a roll of bills, which Minnie finds and brings to Jim. There is much comedy business between Minnie and Jim. In the end, Jim has won the gratitude of the girl and her people by using this money to pay Hardscratch and chase him from the house."

== Cast ==
- Jimmy Aubrey as Jim
- Maude Emory as Girl, under the threat of eviction
- Oliver Hardy as Strongarm (as Babe Hardy)
- Snooky as Minnie, a Chimp (as Snookums the Chimpanzee)

== See also ==
- List of American films of 1919
- Oliver Hardy filmography
