= Healthy and Happy =

1919 film

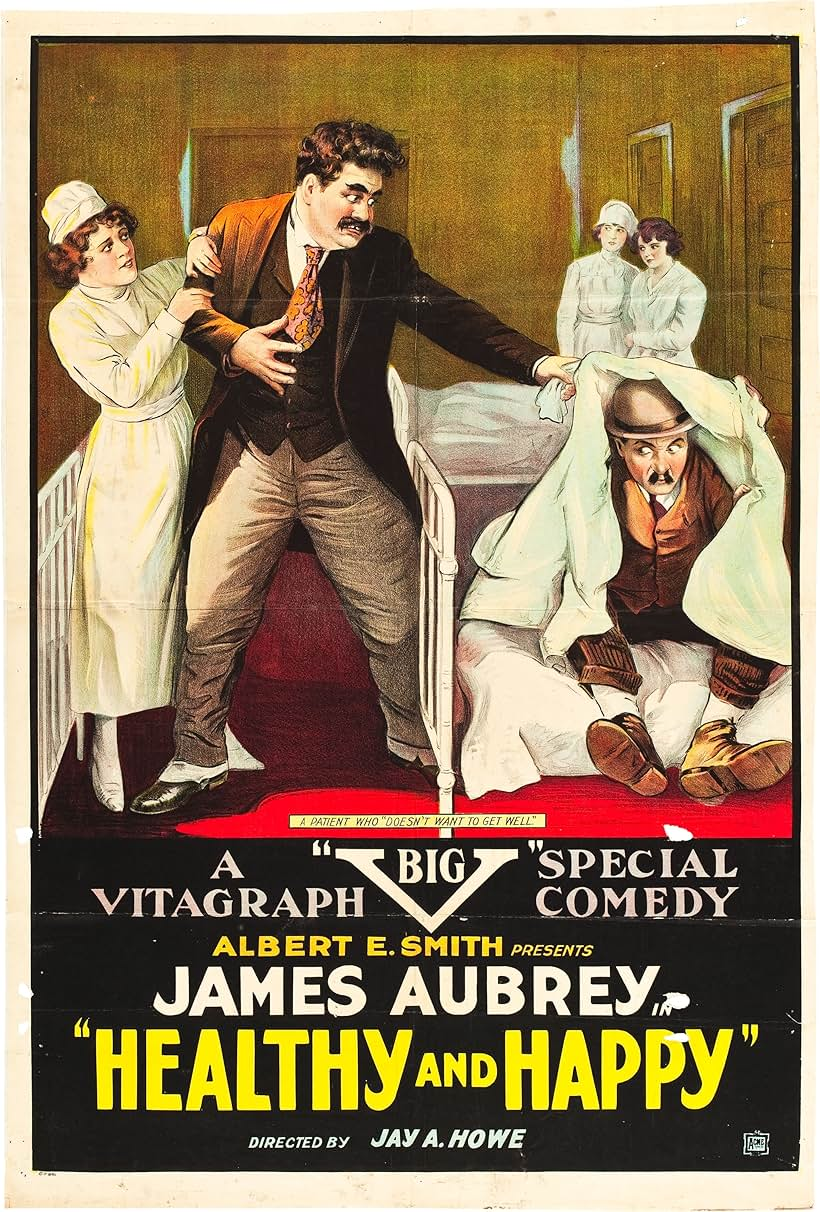
- Directed by: Noel M. Smith
- Produced by: Albert E. Smith
- Starring: Jimmy Aubrey; Oliver Hardy
- Production company: Vitagraph Studios
- Distributed by: Vitagraph Studios
- Release date: June 2, 1919
- Country: United States
- Languages: Silent film English intertitles

Healthy and Happy is a 1919 American silent short comedy film directed by Noel M. Smith featuring Jimmy Aubrey and Oliver Hardy.

== Plot ==
According to the copyright description, "Jimmy trips through the rain and mud, until he comes upon Dr. Nerve, who is coaxing his "canon hall express", in the form of a two-seater, to move on, Jimmy meets Kellie, the nifty nurse and flirts with her. He is chased from the hospital by Dr. Nerve. Wishing to be near the nurse, he tries to wreck himself, finally enters the hospital through the aid of one of the doctor's tools. Unable to cover the expense of his examination, he is forced to work it out. His novel way of treating the patients, and the final break with the doctor make a very humorous story. In the automobile chase that ensues, the police join in, and the picture fades out on the ambulance carrying Jimmy, after his collision with the other two cars."

== Cast ==
- Jimmy Aubrey as Quincy
- Oliver Hardy as Doctor (as Babe Hardy)
- Richard Smith

== Censorship ==
Before Healthy and Happy could be exhibited in Kansas, the Kansas Board of Review required the removal of a scene where a doctor looks at and takes down a bird cage, the doctor burning his rear and sitting in a tub, and all subsequent scenes of the tub attached to his rear.

== See also ==
- List of American films of 1919
- Oliver Hardy filmography
