= The Lucky Dog =

1921 film by Jess Robbins

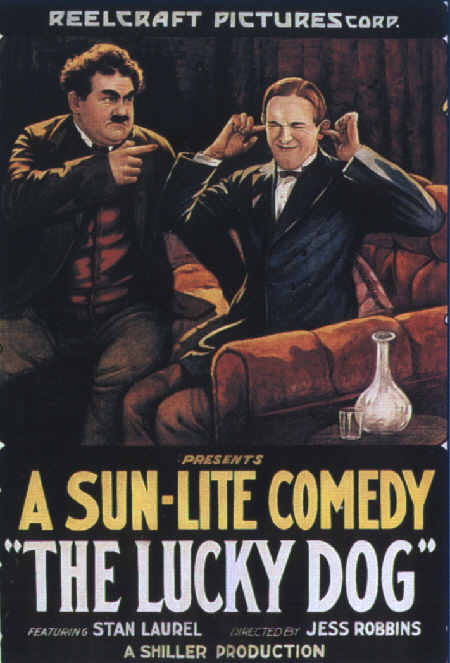
- Directed by: Jess Robbins
- Produced by: Broncho Billy Anderson; Gilbert M. 'Broncho Billy' Anderson
- Starring: Stan Laurel; Oliver Hardy; Florence Gilbert; Jack Lloyd
- Cinematography: Irving G. Ries
- Production company: Sun-Lite Pictures
- Distributed by: Metro Pictures (as Reelcraft Pictures)
- Release date: December 1, 1921 (U.S.)
- Running time: 24 minutes 17 minutes (cut edition)
- Country: United States
- Languages: Silent film English (original intertitles)

The Lucky Dog (1921) is the first film to include Stan Laurel and Oliver Hardy together in a film before they became the famous comedy duo of Laurel and Hardy. Although they appear in scenes together, Laurel and Hardy play independently. Laurel is the star as the hero of the film and Hardy plays the main villain opposite him.

The film was screened as two reels, but some versions end abruptly after the first reel when Laurel is robbed by Hardy.

== Plot ==
The Lucky Dog (1921)

A hapless hero who is evicted for not paying his rent is befriended by a stray dog. The man encounters a thief in the process of robbing someone. The thief, who has accidentally placed his victim’s money into the young man's back pocket, turns from his first victim to rob the young man. The thief then steals the money that he had already stolen from the bemused young man who had thought that he was broke.

The young man and the dog escape and the dog befriends a poodle. The poodle’s lady owner persuades the young man to enter his dog into the local dog show. When his entry is refused for not being a thoroughbred, the young man sneaks into the show but is quickly ejected, followed by all of the dogs in the show. The young man spots the poodle’s owner outside looking for her dog and offers his dog in its place. She accepts and offers to take him to her home. This scene is witnessed by her jealous boyfriend, who meets the thief. The men plot their revenge on the young man.

At the lady's house, the young man is introduced to the boyfriend and the thief, in disguise as a Swiss count. The boyfriend proposes marriage and is rejected, while the thief attempts to shoot the young man, but the gun misfires. The boyfriend chases the lady around the house while the thief tries to attack the young man with a stick of dynamite. The dog picks up the dynamite as if it were a stick, chasing the thief and the boyfriend into the garden. When beckoned, the dog drops the dynamite and returns to Laurel and the girl, leaving the two men to be victims of the exploding dynamite.

== Cast ==
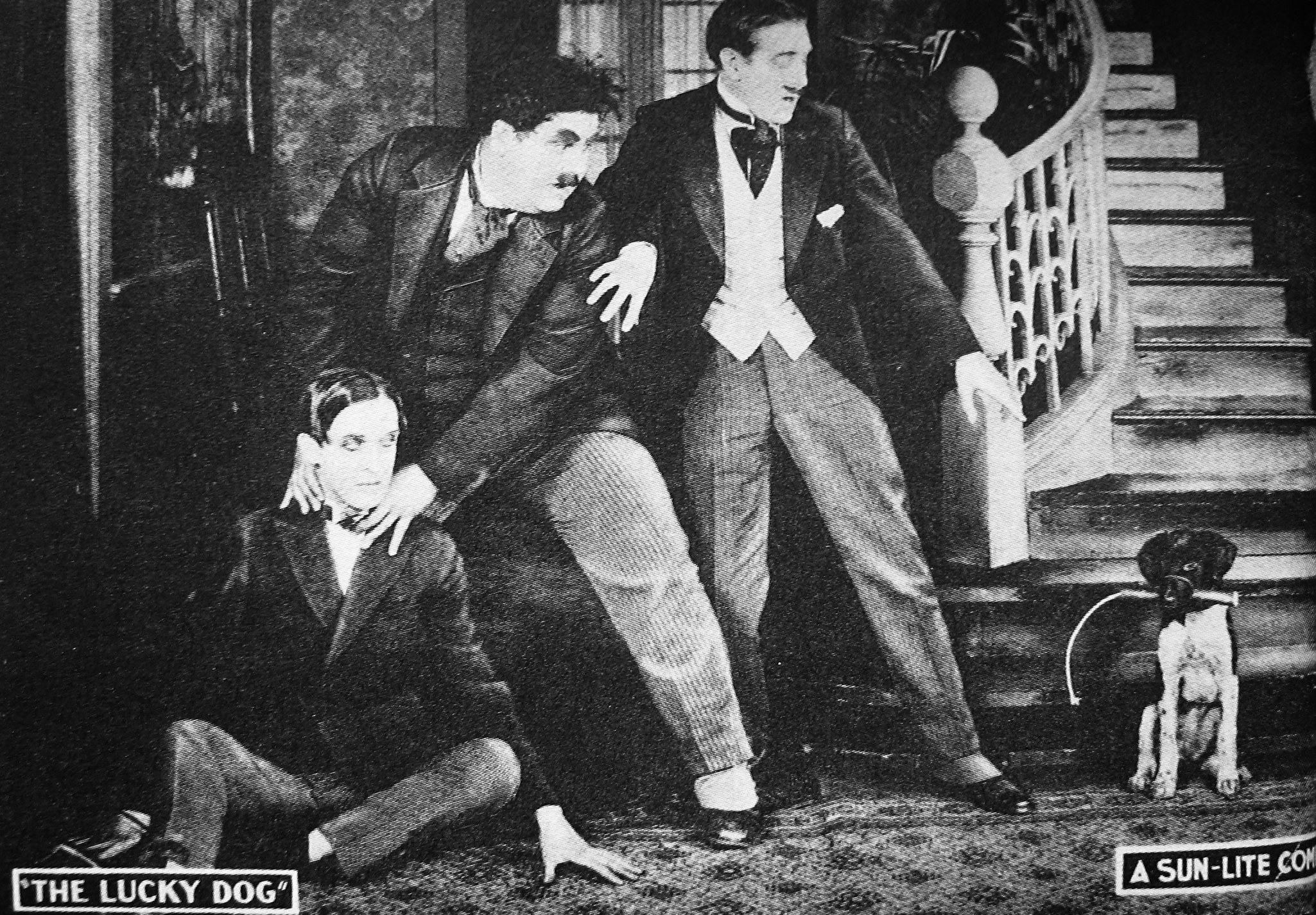
Lobby card with (from left) Stan Laurel, Oliver Hardy, and Jack Lloyd

- Stan Laurel – Young man
- Oliver Hardy – Bandit
- Florence Gilbert – Girl
- Jack Lloyd – Boyfriend

== Production ==
The precise date on which the film was shot is unknown. It had long been believed that the film was produced in 1917, partially because of comments by Laurel in a 1957 interview. Other sources dated the film to 1918 and 1919. However, on the basis of an examination of the dates on which Laurel was available for filming, and the appearance of a 1920 automobile license plate in one shot of the complete film, the filming most likely occurred during the autumn and winter of 1920 and into early 1921. The film was released for distribution in late 1921 by Reelcraft.

The film's production cost was estimated at approximately $3,000.
