= Jess Robbins =

American film director

- Born: April 30, 1886; Dayton, Ohio, US
- Died: March 11, 1973 (aged 86); Los Angeles, California, US
- Occupation: Film director
- Years active: 1913–1927

Jess Robbins (April 30, 1886 – March 11, 1973) was an American film director, writer and producer. He directed more than 70 films between 1913 and 1927. He was the first director to direct Laurel and Hardy in the same motion picture, namely The Lucky Dog.

== Selected filmography ==
- His New Job (1915)
- A Night Out (1915)
- The Champion (1915)
- A Jitney Elopement (1915)
- The Tramp (1915)
- By the Sea (1915)
- Work (1915)
- A Woman (1915)
- The Bank (1915)
- Shanghaied (1915)
- A Night in the Show (1915)
- Police (1916)
- Burlesque on Carmen (1916)
- Triple Trouble (1918)
- Fists and Fodder (1920)
- Pals and Pugs (1920)
- He Laughs Last (1920)
- Springtime (1920)
- The Decorator (1920)
- The Trouble Hunter (1920)
- His Jonah Day (1920)
- The Backyard (1920)
- The Nuisance (1921)
- The Mysterious Stranger (1921)
- The Blizzard (1921)
- The Tourist (1921)
- The Lucky Dog (1921)
- A Front Page Story (1922)
- The Ladder Jinx (1922)
- Too Much Business (1922)
- The Law Forbids (1924)
- Should Sailors Marry? (1925)
- The Business of Love (1925)
- A Little Bit of Fluff (1928)
