= The Blizzard (1921 film) =

1921 film

- Directed by: Jess Robbins
- Written by: Jess Robbins
- Produced by: Albert E. Smith
- Starring: Oliver Hardy
- Production company: Vitagraph Studios
- Distributed by: Vitagraph Studios
- Release date: February 1921
- Country: United States
- Languages: Silent film English intertitles

The Blizzard is a 1921 American silent short comedy film featuring Oliver Hardy.

== Plot ==
According to the copyright description, "Jimmy finds it hard work keeping comfortable while the blizzard rages. A woman is seen seeking shelter with her baby. Finally is forced into the apartment house by a suspicious policeman. She catches a glimpse of the janitor but when she seeks him she cannot find him. She leaves the baby on Jimmy’s bed and goes off in search of the janitor, Jimmy finds the baby who starts in crying. Jimmy, who has won the enmity of the janitor and policeman by throwing a deluge of snow upon them, is caught by the janitor while out on a rampage for milk for the crying infant. He is being beaten unmercifully when the woman returns and takes up the baby. The neighbors in the house hear the noise and phone for an ambulance. The explanations reveal the woman as the janitor's wife and his child, Jimmy who had been thrown out the window by the janitor, falls through the ambulance and lands deep in the snow. The policeman discovers him and starts digging him out, Jimmy evades him however, and is being pursued as the picture fades."

== Cast ==
- Jimmy Aubrey as The sleeper
- Oliver Hardy as Janitor (as Babe Hardy)
- Maude Emory as The girl/the mother
- Jack Lloyd as A tenant
- Vincent McDermott as Policeman

== See also ==
- List of American films of 1921
