= Flips and Flops =

1919 film

- Directed by: Gilbert Pratt
- Written by: Gilbert Pratt
- Produced by: Albert E. Smith
- Starring: Oliver Hardy
- Production company: Vitagraph Studios
- Distributed by: Vitagraph Studios
- Release date: June 30, 1919
- Country: United States
- Languages: Silent film English intertitles

Flips and Flops is a 1919 American silent short comedy film directed by Gilbert Pratt featuring Jimmy Aubrey and Oliver Hardy.

== Plot ==
According to the copyright description, "Jimmy is compelled to retreat when he tries to flirt without a license. He annoys the park policeman who chases him, He comes upon Stella Flip, seeking her run-a-way dog, He helps her hunt for the dog, finally resting on a bench, Jimmy is surprised suddenly by the dog jumping upon the bench with friendliness to him. He falls asleep on the bench and dreams the following. Mr. Jipper, more of a robber than the usual hotel proprietor, is caught in a safety first trap, when he tries to pick Willie Hold's pocket, and Willie, who is a salesman for the Safety First Trans tries to sell him a trap, Jimmy arrives with the dog, meets Stella and returns the dog to her. He is trying to make a hit with Stella, when the proprietor interferes, and has him kicked out, Jimmy, nothing daunted, finds his way back, as a bell hop. After causing considerable trouble, he finally lands in the crook's den, and the proprietor, who is also the leader of the gang, makes him a member of it. During the course of his operations as one of the gang, Jimmy is forced to operate on an audience in the hotel room, which was borrowed to display some of the latest creations and shapes. Caught in the act by the policeman, Jimmy makes his escape, seeking safety behind the curtains of the stage. When the curtain goes up he has assumed the disguise of a nifty bathing suit - and again as Madame Peekaboo, when the cop and proprietor discover him. There is a wild chase, Jimmy finally wakes up, the policeman rapping him with his club, and finds the dog next to him. He grabs up the dog, and runs with it, as the policeman looks after him, scratching his head in perplexity."

== Cast ==
- Jimmy Aubrey as Jimmy
- Oliver Hardy as Mr. Jipper (as Babe Hardy)
- Richard Smith

== Censorship ==
Before Flips and Flops could be exhibited in Kansas, the Kansas Board of Review required the removal of closeups with bathing girls.

== See also ==
- List of American films of 1919
- Oliver Hardy filmography
