= Maids and Muslin =

1920 film

- Directed by: Noel M. Smith
- Written by: Anthony Coldeway
- Produced by: Albert E. Smith
- Starring: Oliver Hardy
- Production company: Vitagraph Studios
- Distributed by: Vitagraph Studios
- Release date: March 1, 1920
- Country: United States
- Languages: Silent film English intertitles

Maids and Muslin is a 1920 American silent short comedy film featuring Oliver Hardy.

== Plot ==
According to the copyright description, "Two partners run a department store. Both are in love with the cashier. Finding that she prefers his partner, the rival becomes hateful and vindictive. Through carelessness while waiting on a customer, the partner causes a disturbance in the store, the credit of which is given to the rival. He decides to take it out on the partner, and beats him up, after his scheme to cause a quarrel between the partner and his sweetheart has failed. The rival receives a bag of counterfeit bills from a friend. He is cornered and called up to wait on a customer. He puts his bag down, and the customer, having a similar bag, puts his down beside it. The partner dusting the store, mixes the bags and the villain gives him the wrong bag. The villain then thinking to oust his partner, robs his safe, plants the money from the bag in his partner’s safe, and turns over the store to the partner. He warns the police and the sweetheart that the partner is a counterfeiter and then returns to the store to see what has happened during his absence. Meanwhile the police have raided the store, before the partner has had a change to hide. The partner captured, the villains [sic] is gloating over him when the customer returns with the bag, presents it to the police and explains that the villain tried to pass the counterfeit money onto him. The villain is arrested, the money which he had taken out of the safe found on his person and handed over to the customer. The partner wins his sweetheart."

== Cast ==
- Jimmy Aubrey as Mr. Bolts
- Oliver Hardy as Mr. Yards (as Babe Hardy)

== See also ==
- List of American films of 1920
- Oliver Hardy filmography
