= Springtime (1920 film) =

1920 film

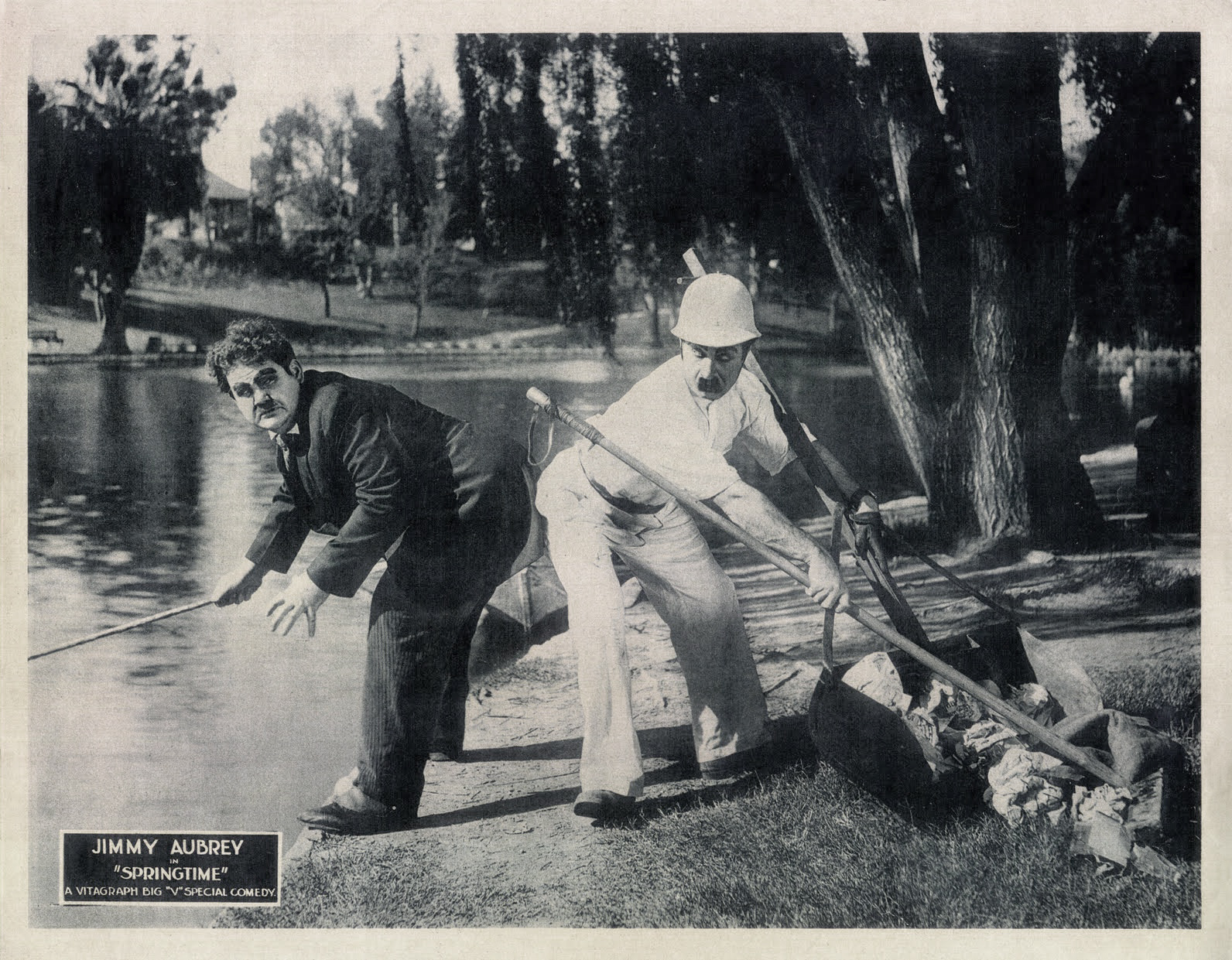
- Lobby card for Springtime, with Jimmy Aubrey (right) and Oliver Hardy (left)
- Directed by: Jess Robbins
- Written by: Jess Robbins
- Produced by: Albert E. Smith
- Starring: Jimmy Aubrey; Oliver Hardy
- Production company: Vitagraph Studios
- Distributed by: Vitagraph Studios
- Release date: August 2, 1920
- Running time: 2 reels
- Country: United States
- Languages: Silent film English intertitles

Springtime is a 1920 American silent comedy film directed by Jess Robbins and starring Oliver Hardy.

== Plot ==
According to the copyright description, "Jimmy, a member of the D.S.C. squad, is caught by the superintendent making love to the maid. The superintendent is held up and robbed by a burglar, who is interrupted by Jimmy. The burglar manages to get away, after the boss has relieved him of the money he took, and takes refuge in one of Jim's ash cans. Jim discovers his hiding place, covers it over and wedges the crook under his cart. In order to get revenge on the superintendent after he has made his escape, the crook steals his baby, while he is talking to the maid.

Jimmy picking up scraps, unconsciously gets the baby on his shovel, and when he discovers it he puts it in his ash can. The crook is flabbergasted to find the baby gone when he looks for it. Meantime, the wife has discovered the loss of the child and the blackmail note and started for the meeting place. Jimmy trying to attract her attention with the baby, sees her driving off with his broom and starts in pursuit on the barrel. The Superintendent, husband of the girl, in turn learns of the kidnapping and sets forth on the cart. The wife arriving at the grove is set upon by the gang, and Jimmy comes in time to rescue her. Husband sees, becomes furiously jealous, downs the gang and starts for Jimmy, but his wife intercedes in Jimmy's behalf - the baby is returned and Jimmy rewarded with an order for a broom."

== Cast ==
- Jimmy Aubrey - The park cleaner
- Dixie Lamont - The maid
- Oliver Hardy - The Commissioner (as Babe Hardy)
- Evelyn Nelson - His daughter

== See also ==
- List of American films of 1920
