= Squeaks and Squawks =

1920 film

- Directed by: Noel M. Smith
- Written by: Anthony Coldeway
- Produced by: Albert E. Smith
- Starring: Jimmy Aubrey; Oliver Hardy
- Production company: Vitagraph Studios
- Distributed by: Vitagraph Studios
- Release date: March 29, 1920
- Country: United States
- Languages: Silent film English intertitles

Squeaks and Squawks is a 1920 American silent short comedy film featuring Oliver Hardy.

== Plot ==
According to the copyright description, "The village blacksmith no longer lingers under the chestnut tree. He reclines under the flivver. Frequently his repair boy is a flivver, also. This one endeavors to conduct a twelve-cylinder romance with the blacksmith's daughter while mending the motors, despite his one-cylinder face, figure and funds. Of course, his lovemaking progresses, but it drives the Fordlets in the cross-roads-machinery hospital to a dizzy madness that wrecks the countryside. Naturally, the garage owner cannot profit with this kind of a love and labor problem. A 1999 model limousine drives up. The liveried chauffeur lifts the lid and exposes the bulky landlord. If the blacksmith cannot pay the rent he will take the girl. But not while a breath of gas remains in the repair boy's chassis, insists that determined youth. In the results chase the moron mechanic hides the landlord's car, discovers his strong box and extracts sufficient cash to permit the blacksmith to lift the monthly mortgage. The girl, unaware of the transaction, elopes with the well-fed gentleman, after he has threatened to punish the thief, unless she consent to meet him. He romantically chooses an ancient carriage for the purpose. The boy, asleep at the forge, is off in pursuit in a pale flivver, followed by father on a motorcycle. The landlord and the girl have a fallin out-about fifty feet over a cliff- and while she is stunned our hero wins her as little flivver for life, much to the disgust of the landlord."

== Cast ==
- Jimmy Aubrey - The Repairman
- Dixie Lamont - The Blacksmith's Daughter
- Oliver Hardy - The Landlord (as Babe Hardy)
- Dick Dickinson - The Blacksmith

== See also ==
- List of American films of 1920
- Oliver Hardy filmography
