= Squabs and Squabbles =

1919 film

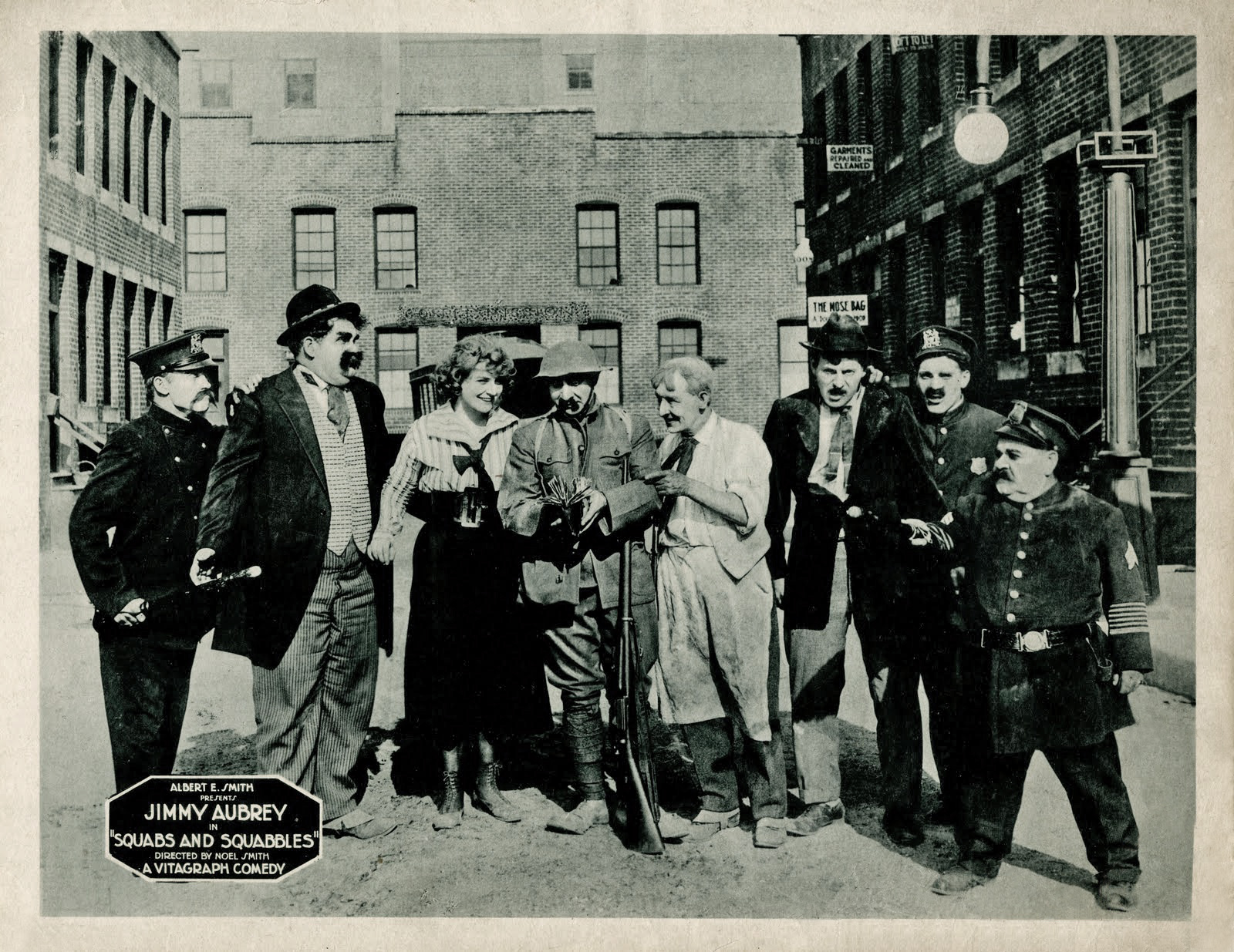
- Lobby card for Squabs and Squabbles, with Jimmy Aubrey (fourth from left) and Oliver Hardy (second from left)
- Directed by: Noel M. Smith
- Written by: Anthony Coldeway
- Produced by: Albert E. Smith
- Starring: Jimmy Aubrey; Oliver Hardy
- Production company: Vitagraph Company of America
- Release date: October 13, 1919
- Country: United States
- Language: Silent (English intertitles)

Squabs and Squabbles is a 1919 American silent comedy film directed by Noel M. Smith featuring Jimmy Aubrey and Oliver Hardy.

== Plot ==
According to the copyright description, "Paradise Alley is a street in a tough neighborhood in which every inhabitant has a grudge against every other one. Consequently the street is a constant battle field. Ruler of the street is the Big Boss. His slumbers are disturbed by the tumult and he appears at the door of his house and yells an order. Instantly the street is cleared. The Boss then goes to a beanery where a beautiful girl presides over the cash register. Around the corner a cop sleeps undisturbed by the constant fighting. As the Boss disappears, the combatants resume their fight. A "man of Mystery" gets in the way of several thrown vegetables and determines to stop the fracas as the Boss did. He goes to the restaurant, borrows the Boss' hat and goes out on the street. He is mistaken for the Boss and the fighters again disappear. The man of mystery then returns the hat, steals the Boss' cigar and disappears. Two or three harmless urchins come forth and play craps. The cop wakes up, seizes them, calls the patrol wagon and the urchins are hustled off to the lock-up. At the far end of the street is a mission. James, our hero is one of the congregation. He sits with wide-staring eyes. The minister gets nervous under his gaze and others the congregation grow restive. It is finally discovered that James has painted the eyes on his eyelids, thus enabling him to appear awake, while he is really sound asleep. He wakes up and in walking out, steals the poor-box. Outside he finds the Boss beating two crooks for stealing. James hurries back and replaces the poor-box. The pretty cashier sees this and extends her sympathy. A fat man is thrown out of the beanery. James and the man of mystery get into his clothes and go in to eat. James hides inside the suit and the man of mystery feeds him. The ruse is discovered and James is put to work in the kitchen. He manages to almost wreck the place. The Boss conspires with the mystery man to rob the restaurant. The Boss passes out the money from the cash register, but James accidentally gets it. The proprietor discovers the loss and pursues the man of mystery. James is required to still the noise of a German street band. He proves a target for all the vegetables thrown at the band. He acquires a soldier's uniform and puts them all to rout. He also helps regain the stolen money of the proprietor and thus proves himself a hit with the girl."

== Cast ==
- Jimmy Aubrey as Jimmy
- Oliver Hardy as The Boss (as Babe Hardy)
- Richard Smith

== Production ==
Filming began in early August 1919 at a specially constructed set on the Vitagraph backlot, and filming wrapped up near the end of the month.

== Censorship ==
Before Squabs and Squabbles could be exhibited in Kansas, the Kansas Board of Review required the removal of all action inside of the mission. The reason given was that it made comedy out of a religious service.

== See also ==
- List of American films of 1919
- Oliver Hardy filmography
