= Richard Smith (silent film director) =

American scenarist, actor, and film director

- Born: September 17, 1886; Cleveland, Ohio, U.S.
- Died: 1937 (aged 50); Los Angeles, California, U.S.
- Other names: Dick Smith
- Occupations: Film director, screenwriter, actor
- Spouse: Alice Howell (m. 1922)

Richard Smith (September 17, 1886 – 1937), also known as Dick Smith, was a screenwriter, actor, and film director. Smith was born in Cleveland, Ohio, and became a comedian active in the vaudeville era. He met his wife Alice Howell in 1910 and the two performed together as Howell and Howell. After working under direction of Mack Sennett at the American Mutoscope and Biograph Company in New York City, Smith moved to Los Angeles, California. Smith and his wife starred in reels together produced by L-KO Kompany.

While Howell was contracted at Universal Studios, Smith directed her in films described in the book Clown Princes and Court Jesters as, "some of Universal's most memorable comedies of the twenties". With colleague Vin Moore, Smith directed actor Oliver Hardy in the 1920 film Distilled Love. Smith directed the Marx Brothers in 1921 in their first film, titled Humor Risk, which has since been lost. In 1925, Smith's directing work included films starring Bert Roach, Neely Edwards, and Charles Puffy. His contributions at Universal included a series of comedy films called "The Collegians".

== Career ==
=== Vaudeville ===
Richard Smith was active in the field of comedy, and participated in the vaudeville scene. He met his wife Alice Howell when she was a member of a production by DeWolf Hopper, in 1910. The two utilized the title of a previously known vaudeville group, and performed together as Howell and Howell. The Howell and Howell duo performed together for three years. Their performances included burlesque and vaudeville. Mack Sennett directed Smith at the American Mutoscope and Biograph Company in New York City. Sennett offered Smith a chance to go with him when he started the company Keystone Studios, but he declined the opportunity.

=== Film director ===
Due to a medical condition, Smith decided to switch his residence from New York to Los Angeles, California, where his wife began to gain roles in the film industry under Sennett in 1914. The two starred together in reels including Dad's Dollars and Dirty Doings, a comedy by L-KO Kompany. Under the production company Reelcraft Pictures, Smith wrote and directed several films which his wife starred in. In the book Clown Princes and Court Jesters, authors Kalton C. Lahue and Samuel Gill describe these films directed by Smith and starring Howell as "low-burlesque charades and as such were slanted toward the neighborhood and second-run houses, where they found receptive audiences."

After his wife became an actress in features at Universal Studios in 1921, Smith directed her in multiple comedies. Lahue and Gill characterize these films as, "some of Universal's most memorable comedies of the twenties", and note, "Starting with the usual framework provided by the situation comedy format, directors William Watson and Richard Smith inserted a sufficient amount of subdued slapstick to flavor these single reels with laugh after laugh." Comedian Oliver Hardy acted under the direction of Smith and associate Vin Moore, in the 1920 film Distilled Love; Smith also had an acting role in the film as an artist. He served as director in 1921 of Humor Risk, the first film starring the Marx Brothers. Smith directed actors including Bert Roach and Neely Edwards in the 1925 film A Nice Pickle, and Charles Puffy the same year in Muddled Up. After Howell retired from film in the 1926, Smith kept up with his contracted work at Universal and wrote a set of comedy films called "The Collegians". Smith died in 1937 in Los Angeles, California, at fifty years old.

== Filmography ==
Year	Film	Role
1914	Gussle, the Golfer	Actor: "Card Player"
1914	The Noise of Bombs	Actor
1915	A Bathhouse Tragedy	Actor
1915	A Stool Pigeon's Revenge	Actor
1915	Disguised But Discovered	Actor
1915	Easy Money	Actor
1915	From Beanery to Billions	Actor
1915	Poor But Dishonest	Actor
1915	Scandal in the Family	Actor
1915	Too Many Bachelors	Actor: "One of Peggy's Suitors"
1915	Under the Table	Actor
1916	A Rural Romance	Actor
1916	Dad's Dollars and Dirty Doings	Actor
1916	Flirtation a la Carte	Actor
1916	Her Naughty Eyes	Actor
1916	How Stars Are Made	Actor
1916	Saving Susie from the Sea	Actor
1916	Shooting His 'Art Out	Actor
1916	The Bankruptcy of Boggs and Schultz	Actor
1916	The Double's Troubles	Actor
1916	The Great Smash	Actor
1917	Double Dukes	Director
1917	Fatty's Feature Fillum	Actor: "Desmond"
1917	Hearts and Flour	Director
1917	Little Bo-Peep	Director
1917	Street Cars and Carbuncles	Director
1917	That Dawgone Dog	Director
1917	The Sign of the Cucumber	Director
1917	Vamping Reuben's Millions	Director
1918	Ambrose and His Widow	Actor
1918	Ash-Can Alley	Director
1918	Scars and Bars	Actor
1919	Bungs and Bunglers	Actor
1919	Cymbelles and Boneheads	Actor
1919	Flips and Flops	Actor
1919	Healthy and Happy	Actor
1919	Jazz and Jailbirds	Actor: "Thief"
1919	Let Fido Do It	Actor
1919	Mates and Models	Actor: "A Rival Artist"
1919	A Rag Time Romance	Actor
1919	Squabs and Squabbles	Actor
1919	Switches and Sweeties	Actor
1919	Tootsies and Tamales	Actor
1919	Yaps and Yokels	Actor: "The Father"
1920	Cinderella Cinders	Actor: "The Butler"
1920	Dames and Dentists	Actor
1920	Distilled Love	Director, Actor: "The Color Blind Artist"
1920	Lunatics in Politics	Director, Actor
1920	Squirrel Time	Director
1921	Humor Risk	Director
1923	Chasing Wealth	Writer
1923	Little Miss Hollywood	Actor
1923	Taking Orders	Actor
1924	Feather Pushers	Writer
1924	Green Tees	Director
1924	Horse Play	Director
1924	Marry When Young	Writer
1924	Mind Your Doctor	Director, Writer
1924	Ship Ahoy!	Writer
1924	The Jail Bird	Writer
1924	The Mandarin	Writer
1925	A Nice Pickle	Director, Writer
1925	Black Gold Bricks	Director
1925	City Bound	Director
1925	Locked Out	Writer
1925	Muddled Up	Director, Writer
1925	Nearly Rich	Writer
1925	Nicely Rewarded	Writer
1925	Papa's Pet	Director
1925	Pleasure Bent	Writer
1925	Rolling Stones	Writer
1925	Sleeping Sickness	Director
1925	Speak Easy	Director, Writer
1925	Tenting Out	Director
1925	The Cat's Whiskers	Director, Writer
1925	The Greenhorn	Writer
1925	The Lost Cord	Director, Writer
1925	The Lucky Accident	Writer
1925	The Milky Way	Director, Writer
1925	Under a Spell	Director
1925	Unwelcome	Director
1926	Fresh Paint	Director, Writer
1926	Wide Open Faces	Director, Writer
1926	Babes in the Sawdust	Director, Writer
1926	Do or Bust	Director, Writer
1926	Find the Woman	Actor: "George Stevenson"
1926	Help Wanted	Director, Writer
1926	Hook or Crook	Director, Writer
1926	Horse Laugh	Director, Writer
1926	It's All Over Now	Director, Writer
1926	Love's Labor Lost	Director, Writer
1926	Mixed Doubles	Director, Writer
1926	Nobody Loves Me	Director, Writer
1926	The College Yell	Director, Writer
1926	The Crowned Prince	Director, Writer
1926	The Optimist	Director, Writer
1926	The Phoney Express	Director, Writer
1926	The Thirteenth Man	Director, Writer
1926	What Price Pleasure?	Director, Writer
1926	Where's My Baby?	Director, Writer
1926	Who's Next?	Director, Writer
1926	Wild Bill	Director, Writer
1926	Wise or Otherwise	Director
1926	Wives and Women	Director
1927	A One Man Show	Director
1927	A Sleepy Time Pal	Director, Writer
1927	Ali Gazam	Director, Writer
1927	Baby Brother	Actor
1927	High and Dizzy	Director, Writer
1927	Oh! What a Kick!	Director
1927	Red Suspenders	Director
1927	Surprised Honey	Writer
1927	Why Mules Leave Home	Director
1929	Watch Your Friends	Director
1936	Fibbing Fibbers	Writer

== See also ==
- Cinematography
- Directorial debut
- Filmmaking
- List of directorial debuts
- List of film and television directors
