= The Candy Kid (1928 film) =

1928 film

- Directed by: David Kirkland
- Written by: David Kirkland; Rex Lease
- Starring: Rex Lease; Pauline Garon; Frank Campeau
- Cinematography: Bert Baldridge; Charles Bottle
- Edited by: Minnie Steppler
- Production company: Dailey Productions
- Release date: July 1928
- Running time: 7 reels
- Country: United States
- Languages: Silent; English intertitles

The Candy Kid is a 1928 American silent drama film directed by David Kirkland and starring Rex Lease, Pauline Garon and Frank Campeau.

== Cast ==
- Rex Lease
- Pauline Garon
- Frank Campeau
- Harry Woods
- Roy Stewart
- Charlotte Merriam
- Paul Panzer

== Bibliography ==
- Munden, Kenneth White. The American Film Institute Catalog of Motion Pictures Produced in the United States, Part 1. University of California Press, 1997.
