= Irving G. Ries =

Eustace Lycett
- Born: Eustace Arden Lycett; January 15, 1890; Akron, Ohio, USA
- Died: August 20, 1963 (aged 73); Hollywood, California, USA
- Occupations: Special effects artist and cinematographer
- Years active: 1913-1956

Irving G. Ries (January 15, 1890 – August 20, 1963) was a silent-era cinematographer who went on to do special effects during the sound era. He often worked with Stan Laurel when he was a cinematographer. As well as a few Oliver Hardy short films. He also did the first film they worked together on The Lucky Dog.

He was nominated at the 29th Academy Awards in the category of Best Special Effects for his work on the film Forbidden Planet. He shared his nomination with A. Arnold Gillespie and Wesley C. Miller.

== Selected filmography ==
=== Cinematographer ===
- Barbarous Mexico (1913)
- On the Firing Line with the Germans (1915)
- The Slavey (1919)
- The Backyard (1920)
- Dames and Dentists (1920)
- The Decorator (1920)
- Fists and Fodder (1920)
- He Laughs Last (1920)
- The Lucky Dog (1921)
- The Ladder Jinx (1922)
- Mud and Sand (1922)
- The Pest (1922)
- The Handy Man (1923)
- When Knights Were Cold (1923)
- Biff Bang Buddy (1924)
- Cyclone Buddy (1924)
- Fast and Fearless (1924)
- Hard-Hittin' Hamilton (1924)
- Gold and Grit (1925)
- The Hollywood Revue of 1929 (1929)
- The Mysterious Island (1929)

=== As a Special effects artist ===
- The Canterville Ghost (1944)
- Plymouth Adventure (1952)
- Singin' in the Rain (1952)
- Forbidden Planet (1956)
