= Bungs and Bunglers =

1919 film

- Directed by: Noel M. Smith
- Written by: Anthony Coldeway
- Produced by: Albert E. Smith
- Starring: Oliver Hardy
- Production company: Vitagraph Studios
- Distributed by: Vitagraph Studios
- Release date: November 24, 1919
- Country: United States
- Languages: Silent film English intertitles

Bungs and Bunglers is a 1919 American silent short comedy film directed by Noel M. Smith featuring Jimmy Aubrey and Oliver Hardy.

== Plot ==
According to the copyright description, "A.K. Hall, the boss of the Dive Inn, threatens the mistress of the Sweet Shop with the mortgage he holds, if she does not yield to his advances. Oswald sends him a box of "Stew drops" which help along the business of the Dive Inn immensely. Hall locks them in his safe, watched by the "man of mystery" and Jim. Meanwhile, over in the Sweet Shop, business is very poor, and the mistress confides to Jim that unless business picks up, she will have to marry Hall. Planning to help her out, Jim gets all his tools and attempts the robbery of the safe. "The man of Mystery" in quest of the "stew drops", has managed to get into the safe. Jim sets his explosives, the safe is blown up. Buried beneath the safe, Jim is not seen by the police and Hall, but the poor "man of mystery" is arrested.

Jim makes his escape with the pills and hands them over to the girl. She uses them and business immediately thrives. Jim is caught by Hall and arrested. In prison he manages to make his escape, followed by the "man of mystery" who has also escaped. On his way he meets a woman driving a ford with a large family of children. He is invited to get in, and the "man of mystery" follows, hopping on behind. In the little sweet shop the villain is triumphant. Jim brings the family to the sweet shop and looks about for the girl. Just then two of the kids wander into the rear room and discover the villain, calling "daddy". Follows the villain's downfall, his wife takes charge of him and marches him off, followed by the rest of the family. The "man of mystery" is discovered to be a revenue officer. Jim and the girl are happily married."

== Cast ==
- Jimmy Aubrey as Jimmy
- Oliver Hardy as Al K. Hall (as Babe Hardy)
- Richard Smith

== Censorship ==
Before Bungs and Bunglers could be exhibited in Kansas, the Kansas Board of Review required the removal of a scene where a man has no trousers, a man drinking at a bar, and the title "Hell, a rum hound" accompanied by the scene of a dog drinking rum.

== See also ==
- List of American films of 1919
- Oliver Hardy filmography
