= Tootsies and Tamales =

1919 film

- Directed by: Noel M. Smith
- Written by: Oliver Hardy; Bud Ross
- Produced by: Albert E. Smith
- Starring: Jimmy Aubrey; Oliver Hardy
- Production company: Vitagraph Studios
- Distributed by: Vitagraph Studios
- Release date: May 19, 1919
- Country: United States
- Languages: Silent film English intertitles

Tootsies and Tamales is a 1919 American silent short comedy film starring Jimmy Aubrey and featuring Oliver Hardy.

== Plot ==
According to the copyright description, "Introduced in a very novel way, we find the villain wooing the heroine, much against her own and father's will. Trapped and captured by the villain and his confederates, the father is bound and gagged until such time as he give in to the villain's demands. The hero arrives, ignores the villain and becomes a target for his anger. Being forced to drink with the villain, the hero does so, and surprises the villain by spitting explosives. His bluff does not hold good for long, and again the villain and he are at war, Finally, with the aid of a bear, they sign an armistice, and the villain goes to his work of studying figures. Hero unintentionally interferes with this, and the armistice is all off. Finally on the "bull-fight " holiday, a temporary truce is reached, and everything goes well, with the hero and the girl, until the hero is called upon to kill the bull, which he does, to the surprise of the villain, who gives orders that the bomb should be set right way to kill the father. The hero and heroine after a thrilling fight with the villain and his confederates, rush to the father's rescue, The three escape from the shack and take refuge on the hero's sea-craft - while the villains, rushing the shack, arrive inside in time to be blown to pieces with it."

== Cast ==
- Jimmy Aubrey - The Rummy Romeo
- Oliver Hardy - The Murderous Mexican (as Babe Hardy)
- Maude Emory - Señorita
- Bud Ross
- Richard Smith

== Censorship ==
Before Tootsies and Tamales could be exhibited in Kansas, the Kansas Board of Review required the elimination of "explosions from man."

== See also ==
- List of American films of 1919
- Oliver Hardy filmography
