= He Laughs Last =

1920 American comedy film

- Lobby card
- Directed by: Jess Robbins
- Written by: Jess Robbins
- Produced by: Albert E. Smith
- Starring: Oliver Hardy
- Cinematography: Irving G. Ries
- Production company: Vitagraph Studios
- Distributed by: Vitagraph Studios
- Release date: June 24, 1920
- Country: United States
- Languages: Silent film English intertitles

He Laughs Last is a 1920 American silent short comedy film featuring Oliver Hardy.

== Plot ==
According to the copyright description, "Jimmy, arriving in the town, which is unable to keep a sheriff in office on account of the villainous doings of the villain, gang leader and his band, takes delight in beating up the villain, the latter attempts to kiss the girl against her will. She appeals to him to take the Sheriff's job and he does so. At first it appears as though he may join his predecessors, but the tide of battle turns in his favor; he beats up the villain; scares the gang out of town and settles down in earnest to his job. His plans to marry the heroine are frustrated, when she turns up with her husband-to-be-who proves to be no other than the previous gang-leader. Jimmy, unable face the happiness of the two, turns his sheriff's job over to the reformed gang-leader and leaves the town."

== Cast ==
- Jimmy Aubrey as The New Sheriff
- Dixie Lamont as The Dove of Peace Center
- Oliver Hardy as Handsome Hal (as Babe Hardy)

== See also ==
- List of American films of 1920
- Oliver Hardy filmography
