= The Little Wild Girl =

1928 film

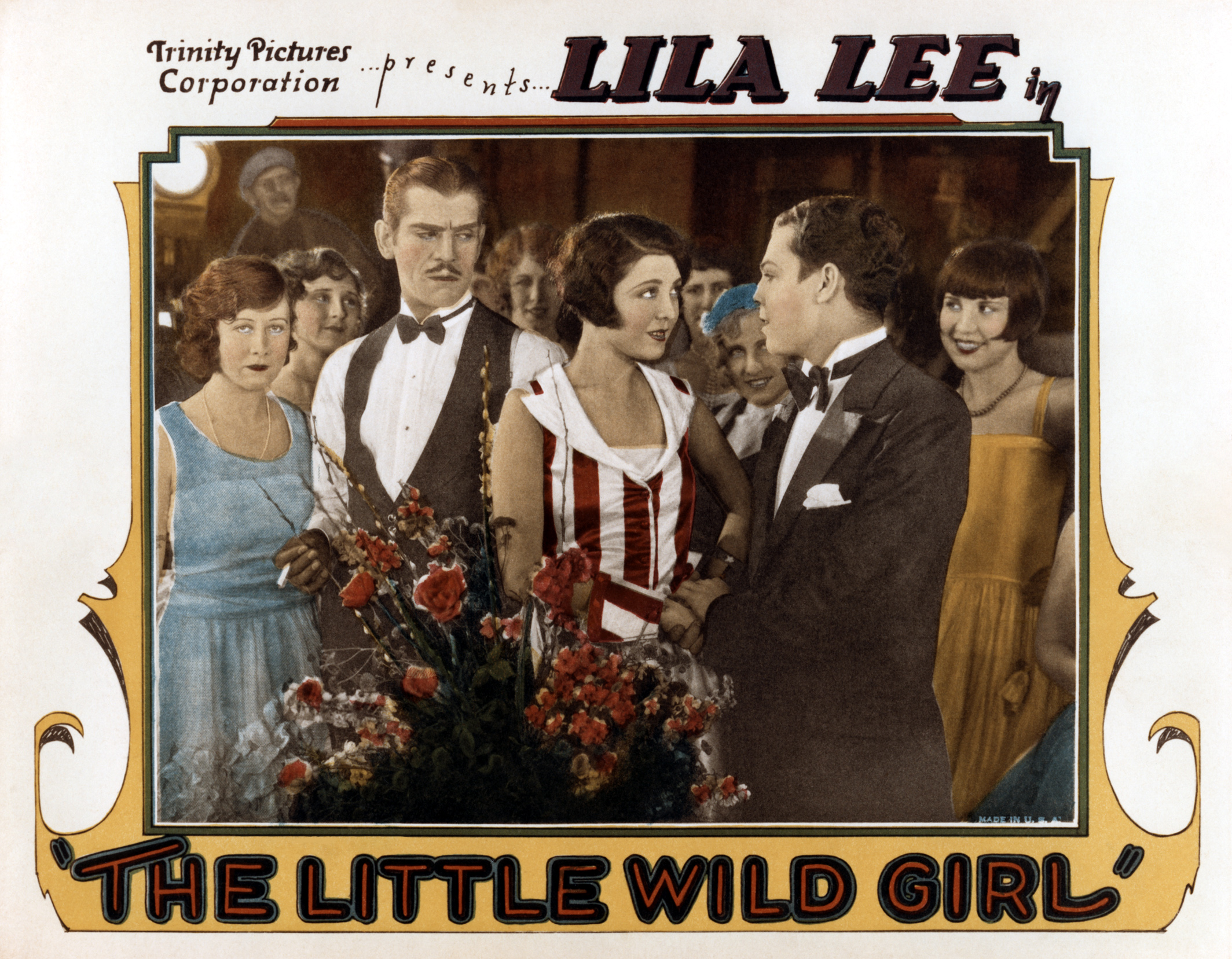
- Film poster
- Directed by: Frank S. Mattison
- Written by: Cecil Burtis Hill; Putnam Hoover; Gordon Kalem
- Produced by: Hercules Film Productions
- Starring: Lila Lee; Cullen Landis
- Cinematography: Jules Cronjager
- Edited by: Minnie Steppler
- Distributed by: Trinity Pictures
- Release date: October 1928
- Running time: 67 minutes; 6 reels
- Country: United States
- Language: Silent with English intertitles

The Little Wild Girl is a 1928 American silent drama film directed by Frank S. Mattison and featuring Boris Karloff. Prints of this film are held at the UCLA Film & Television Archive and the Library of Congress.

== Cast ==
- Lila Lee as Marie Cleste
- Cullen Landis as Jules Barbier
- Frank Merrill as Tavish McBride
- Sheldon Lewis as Wanakee
- Boris Karloff as Maurice Kent
- Jimmy Aubrey as Posty McKnuffle
- Bud Shaw as Oliver Hampton
- Arthur Hotaling as Duncan Cleste

== See also ==
- Boris Karloff filmography
