= Fists and Fodder =

1920 film

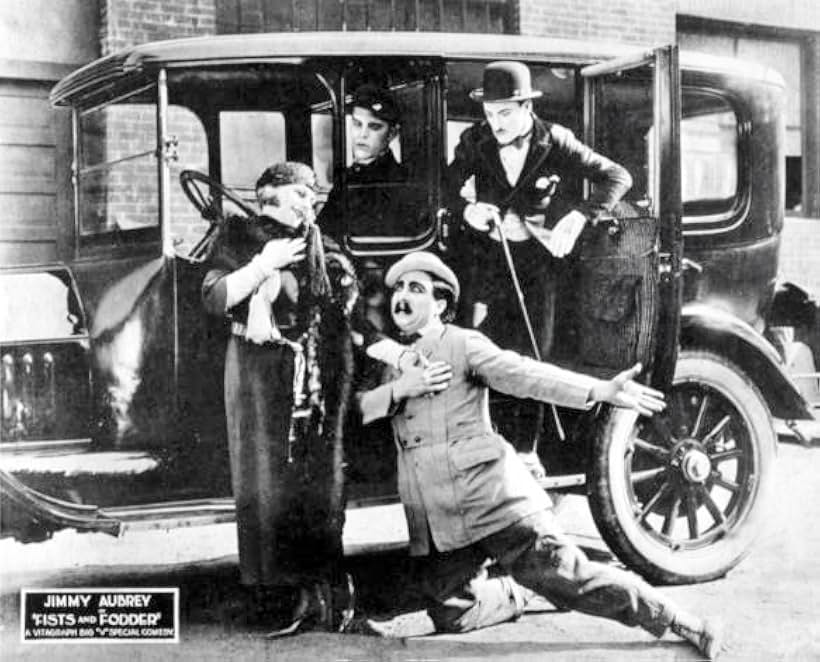
- Film still
- Directed by: Jess Robbins
- Written by: Jess Robbins
- Produced by: Albert E. Smith
- Starring: Oliver Hardy
- Cinematography: Irving G. Ries
- Release date: April 26, 1920
- Country: United States
- Languages: Silent film English intertitles

Fists and Fodder is a 1920 American silent short comedy film featuring Oliver Hardy.

== Plot ==
According to the copyright description, "A settlement worker interrupts a tramp in the act of acquiring a meal by the customary methods. She convinces him stealing is wrong and he carries the stolen things back. He escapes the wrath of the owner of the things, and is walking along when he discovered a table filled with food set across his path. He is about to help himself when a chair is placed for him. The profiteering landlord discovers him and gives him some money to evict the aged couple into the street. Seeing the landlord ill-treating the poor old lady, the tramp intercedes and triumphs over the landlord, who departs with the rent money that had been taken from his pockets. The settlement worker is attacked by a band of kidnappers who had been hired by the villain, when the tramp rescues her, quite accidentally, and she takes him home with her. Here he discovers that the landlord that he had the battle with is the girl's father, and who, much to his surprise, greets him cordially. But this attitude is short lived. Getting him alone, the father holds his victim by the throat as he endeavors to strike him in the face. He misses and drives his fist through a steel safe. The tramp feels sorry for him with all his missing and leads him to one of the marble pillars that support his mansion. He backs his victim against that but missing again, knocks the pillar loose, toppling the house about. The villain who had planned the kidnapping of the girl, seeking access to her room, is caught in the debris."

== Cast ==
- Jimmy Aubrey as A Tramp
- Dixie Lamont as A Settlement Worker
- Oliver Hardy as Her Father (as Babe Hardy)
- Leo White as A Rival

== Preservation ==
A 35 mm copy of Fists and Fodder is held by George Eastman House.

== See also ==
- List of American films of 1920
- Oliver Hardy filmography
