= The Backyard (1920 film) =

1920 film

- Directed by: Jess Robbins
- Written by: Jess Robbins
- Produced by: Albert E. Smith
- Starring: Oliver Hardy
- Cinematography: Irving G. Ries
- Release date: November 1920
- Country: United States
- Languages: Silent film English intertitles

The Backyard is a 1920 American silent comedy film featuring Oliver Hardy. The short film was made by Vitagraph Studios and preserved in 2018 by the Library of Congress, with a new musical score by Ben Model.

== Plot ==
A man lets a group of children shoot arrows at him in an alley game of William Tell. When he tires of being their target, the man separates the children roughly. There is a police chase. Later, dressed as a policeman, the man is asked to stop a "ruffian" who is being mean to a young girl; the ruffian is instead hit by a car.

== Cast ==
- Jimmy Aubrey as The man
- Oliver Hardy as The ruffian (as Babe Hardy)
- Jack Ackroyd as A millionaire
- Kathleen Myers as His daughter
- Evelyn Nelson as His daughter

== See also ==
- List of American films of 1920
