= Old Age Handicap =

1928 film

- Directed by: Frank S. Mattison
- Written by: Cecil Burtis Hill; Putnam Hoover; Charles A. Taylor; Tod Underwood
- Starring: Alberta Vaughn; Gareth Hughes; Vivian Rich
- Cinematography: Jules Cronjager
- Edited by: Minnie Steppler
- Production company: Trinity Pictures
- Distributed by: First Division Pictures
- Release date: 18 May 1928
- Running time: 62 minutes
- Country: United States
- Languages: Silent; English intertitles

Old Age Handicap is a 1928 American silent drama film directed by Frank S. Mattison and starring Alberta Vaughn, Gareth Hughes and Vivian Rich.

== Cast ==
- Alberta Vaughn
- Gareth Hughes
- Vivian Rich
- Olaf Hytten
- Mavis Villiers
- Robert 'Buddy' Shaw
- Jimmy Humes
- Carolyn Wethall
- Robert Rodman
- Frank Mattison Jr.
- Ford Jessen
- Hall Cline
- Edna Hearn
- Arthur Hotaling

== Bibliography ==
- Brent E. Walker. Mack Sennett’s Fun Factory: A History and Filmography of His Studio and His Keystone and Mack Sennett Comedies, with Biographies of Players and Personnel. McFarland, 2013.
