= Pals and Pugs =

1920 film

- Directed by: Jess Robbins
- Written by: Jess Robbins
- Produced by: Albert E. Smith
- Starring: Oliver Hardy
- Production company: Vitagraph Studios
- Distributed by: Vitagraph Studios
- Release date: May 10, 1920
- Country: United States
- Languages: Silent film English intertitles

Pals and Pugs is a 1920 American silent short comedy film featuring Oliver Hardy.

== Plot ==
According to the copyright description, "After the fighting youngsters are dispersed by the policemen, the heiress discovers Jimmy Aubrey at the bottom of the pile, being beaten up by a tiny tormentor. The youngster accuses Jimmy of stealing his banana, and the girl effects a reconciliation between the two. Jimmy standing with the coin in his hand, has it snatched from him by the boy and gives chase. They dash into a character who is enjoying a highly prized bottle and send it spinning into a manhole. The bully witnessing the disappearance of the bottle in the manhole, and with Jimmy as an assistant to hold him, reaches down to get it. Jimmy lets him drop. Jimmy seeks a rope to save the bully, finds one, pulling off a painter's scaffold, leaving him clinging to the roof and sending his paint bucket down on the society idler, who had escorted the heiress, and is after her millions. Almost to the top of the manhole, a street car cuts the rope and the bully falls back. Trying once more, Jimmy falls, breaking the precious bottle. The bully comes up through another manhole, gives Aubrey a good beating and throws him aside. A car comes along and throws the bully back into the manhole. Jimmy standing over the manhole is about to put the cover on, when a cop orders him to move on. Forced to raise his hands, Jimmy marches along, the cop falling into the manhole, Jimmy comes upon the idler and kicks him. The youngster chased by Aubrey, runs about the idler, until he, unable to hold back his temper, picks up the boy and throws him under an automobile. Aubrey and the girl pick the boy up and carry him into the house. The idler and bully meet as old friends and the idler hires the bully to kidnap the girl, get rough when he, will play her rescuer. The bully waits for her. Aubrey sent for liniment, sees the bully and returns to the room, sending the girl to get it herself. The bully gets her into his room and locks the door. She screams, and Aubrey hearing comes out to find the idler peeping through the keyhole. He kicks him out of the way, sees what is going on when the idler kicks him in turn. Jimmy uses the idler as a ladder and climbs into the room, rescuing the girl. The bully chases him and finally catching him, when the youngster hails Jimmy as his pal. He turns out to be the son of the bully. The latter gets the idler and the youngster gives him a good beating, ending by having his father throw the idler out the window into a rubbage can. Meanwhile, Aubrey's conduct has won the approval of the heiress, but as he leans against the limousine, after receiving a rose for his reward, the car drives off and precipitates him into the street. He turns to find the idler's feet protruding from the rubbage can and covers them. The police man is about to grab him when a vase knocked out the window by the bully who rocked against it hits him. Aubrey places his flower on the policeman as the picture fades."

== Cast ==
- Jimmy Aubrey as An outcast
- Dixie Lamont as An heiress
- Oliver Hardy as A bully (as Babe Hardy)
- Leo White as Beau Brummel

== See also ==
- List of American films of 1920
- Oliver Hardy filmography
