= Jimmy Aubrey =

English actor (1887–1983)

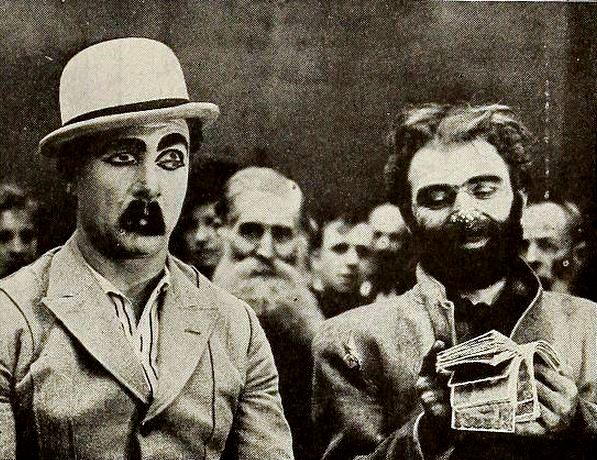
- Still from Squabs and Squabbles (1919), where Aubrey (at left) has painted eyes upon his eyelids so he can sleep during a meeting at a mission, but peeks when a man takes out his money
- Born: James Aubrey Whitehead; 23 October 1887; Bolton, Lancashire, England
- Died: 2 September 1983 (aged 95); Woodland Hills, California, United States

Jimmy Aubrey (23 October 1887 – 2 September 1983) was an English actor who worked with both Charlie Chaplin and Laurel and Hardy, having gone with Fred Karno's theatrical company to the United States in 1908. However he left to start on his own in vaudeville. He started in comedies, then went on to comedic roles in drama and westerns, such as Rainbow Riders, in 1934.

He appeared in 419 films between 1915 and 1953.

== Selected filmography ==
- Laughing Gas (1915)
- Bungs and Bunglers (1919)
- Flips and Flops (1919)
- Healthy and Happy (1919)
- Jazz and Jailbirds (1919)
- Mates and Models (1919)
- Mules and Mortgages (1919)
- Soapsuds and Sapheads (1919)
- Squabs and Squabbles (1919)
- Switches and Sweeties (1919)
- Tootsies and Tamales (1919)
- Yaps and Yokels (1919)
- The Backyard (1920)
- His Jonah Day (1920)
- The Trouble Hunter (1920)
- The Decorator (1920)
- Springtime (1920)
- He Laughs Last (1920)
- Pals and Pugs (1920)
- Fists and Fodder (1920)
- Squeaks and Squawks (1920)
- Maids and Muslin (1920)
- Dames and Dentists (1920)
- The Tourist (1921)
- The Blizzard (1921)
- The Mysterious Stranger (1920)
- The Nuisance (1921)
- Bashful Buccaneer (1925)
- Oh Billy, Behave (1926)
- Pirates of the Sky (1926)
- The Last Alarm (1926)
- The Winning Wallop (1926)
- The Gallant Fool (1926)
- The Call of the Klondike (1926)
- The Down Grade (1927)
- Smiling Billy (1927)
- Ladies Beware (1927)
- Wilful Youth (1927)
- The Lookout Girl (1928)
- Willful Youth (1928)
- Out with the Tide (1928)
- The Girl He Didn't Buy (1928)
- A Gentleman Preferred (1928)
- The Little Wild Girl (1928)
- The Sky Hawk (1929)
- China Slaver (1929)
- That's My Wife (1929)
- The Midnight Special (1930)
- The Grand Parade (1930)
- Code of Honor (1930)
- Under Montana Skies (1930)
- The Lonesome Trail (1930)
- Women Must Marry (1931)
- Trapped (1931)
- The Sheriff's Secret (1931)
- Lariats and Six-Shooters (1931)
- Women Men Marry (1931)
- 45 Calibre Echo (1932)
- Out of Singapore (1932)
- Bachelor Mother (1932)
- Echo (1932)
- Sons of the Desert (1933)
- Picture Brides (1934)
- Rawhide Mail (1934)
- Paradise Valley (1934)
- Down for Trouble (1934)
- The Border Menace (1934)
- Inside Information (1934)
- Loser's End (1935)
- Rescue Squad (1935)
- Rustler's Paradise (1935)
- Make a Million (1935)
- Judgment Book (1935)
- Courage of the North (1935)
- Fast Bullets (1936)
- Night Cargo (1936)
- Ridin' On (1936)
- Too Much Beef (1936)
- Aces and Eights (1936)
- Go Get 'Em Haines (1936)
- Stormy Trails (1936)
- Million Dollar Racket (1937)
- The Rangers' Round-Up (1938)
- Law of the Wolf (1939)
- Smoky Trails (1939)
- Mr. Moto Takes a Vacation (1939)
- Covered Wagon Trails (1940)
- Pioneer Days (1940)
- Souls in Pawn (1940)
- The Kid from Santa Fe (1940)
- Wild Horse Valley (1940)
- Dangerous Lady (1941)
- Dr. Jekyll and Mr. Hyde (1941)
- Boot Hill Bandits (1942)
- Border Roundup (1942)
- Broadway Big Shot (1942)
- Swamp Woman (1942)
- Wild Horse Rustlers (1943)
- The Drifter (1944)
- The Green Years (1946)
- Thunder Town (1946)
- Rendezvous 24 (1946)
- Mr. Hex (1946)
- Ghost of Hidden Valley (1946)
- Jiggs and Maggie in Society (1947)
- Jiggs and Maggie in Court (1948)
- I Wouldn't Be in Your Shoes (1948)
- Jiggs and Maggie in Jackpot Jitters (1949)
- Dangerous When Wet (1953)
- The King's Thief (1955)
