= Anthony Coldeway =

American screenwriter (1887–1963)

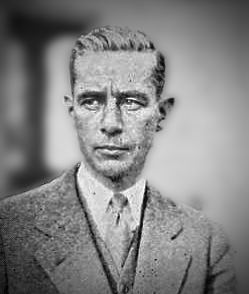
- Coldeway in 1926
- Born: Anthony W. Coldewey; August 1, 1887; Louisville, Kentucky, U.S.
- Died: January 29, 1963 (aged 75); Los Angeles, California, U.S.
- Occupation: Screenwriter
- Years active: 1910–1954

Anthony W. Coldeway (August 1, 1887 – January 29, 1963) was an American screenwriter who had an extensive career from 1910 through 1954. Although most of his work was on films, he did some writing for television and also was the director of a silent film, entitled Her Great Dilemma, in 1917. He was born in Louisville, Kentucky.

In 1928, he was nominated for an Academy Award for Best Adapted Screenplay at the 1st Academy Awards for his film Glorious Betsy.

== Selected filmography ==
- The Morals of Hilda (1916)
- Which Woman? (1918)
- His Buddy (1919)
- The Fighting Heart (1919)
- The Four-Bit Man (1919)
- The Jack of Hearts (1919)
- Mates and Models (1919)
- Squabs and Squabbles (1919)
- Bungs and Bunglers (1919)
- Switches and Sweeties (1919)
- Maids and Muslin (1920)
- Squeaks and Squawks (1920)
- King of the Circus (1920)
- Do or Die (1921)
- The Secret Four (1921)
- The Social Buccaneer (1923)
- The Oregon Trail (1923)
- The Phantom Fortune (1923)
- The Eagle's Talons (1923)
- Cobra (1925)
- Fifth Avenue (1926)
- For Wives Only (1926)
- Old San Francisco (1927)
- Glorious Betsy (1928)
- Cross Streets (1934)
- In Spite of Danger (1935)
- Men of the Hour (1935)
- Devil's Island (1939)
- The Gorilla Man (1943)
