= The Nuisance (1921 film) =

1921 film

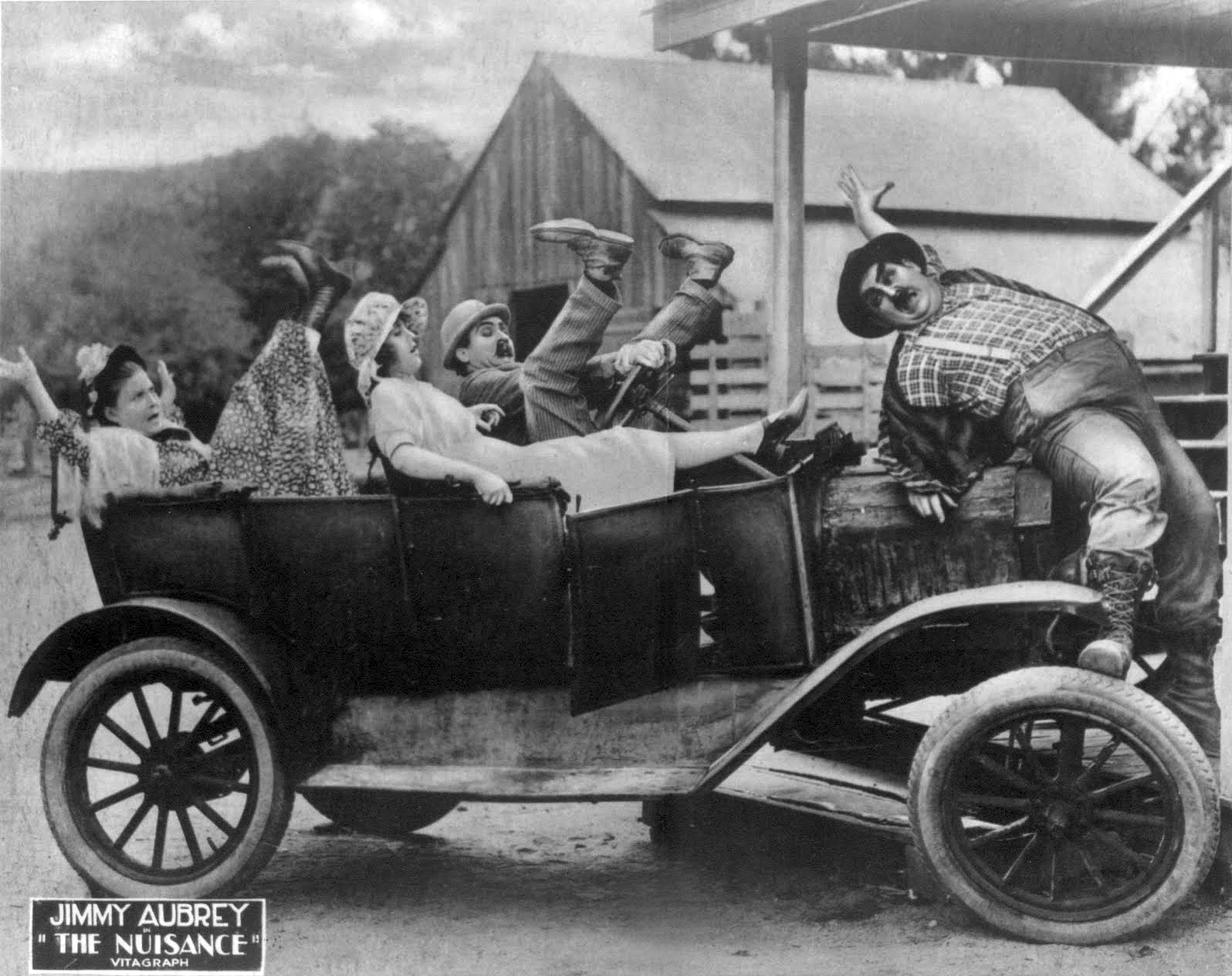
- Promotional still with Rosa Gore, Leila McCarthy, Jimmy Aubrey, and Oliver Hardy
- Directed by: Jess Robbins
- Written by: Jess Robbins
- Produced by: Albert E. Smith
- Starring: Oliver Hardy
- Music by: Albert Niemann
- Production company: Vitagraph Studios
- Distributed by: Vitagraph Studios
- Release date: January 1921
- Running time: 2 reels
- Country: United States
- Language: Silent with English intertitles

The Nuisance is a 1921 American silent short comedy film featuring Oliver Hardy.

== Plot ==
According to the copyright description, "Jimmy conveys an ancient flivver, by his own motive power, with two city slickers, to the widow's farm. The Walrus tries to win the widow's hand and acquire the farm by a proposal but her herd of cats blast the romance. The Widow receives a letter from her daughter in the city to beware of the land sharks, end announcing her arrival. When the daughter arrives, the ubiquitous James, and not the scheming trio, is at the station to meet her. But the scoundrels have just begun their plotting. When the flivver escapes from custody and plunges over an embankment they capture the unconscious lady and secret her in an abandoned house. But James is not far behind. After a series of clashes he overpowers the plotters and wins the girl."

== Cast ==
- Jimmy Aubrey as The nuisance
- Rosa Gore as A widow
- Leila McCarthy as Her daughter
- Oliver Hardy as The walrus (as Babe Hardy)
- Jack Lloyd as City slicker
- George Fox as City slicker

== See also ==
- List of American films of 1921
