= No. 16 Martin Street =

1916 movie directed by Lloyd Carleton

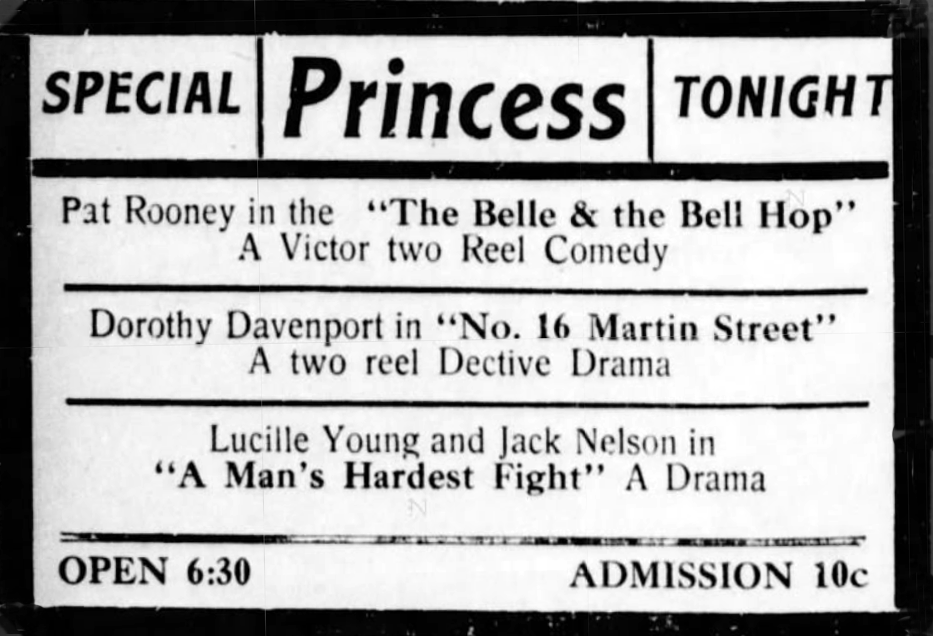
- Newspaper Ad
- Directed by: Lloyd B. Carleton
- Written by: Bess Meredyth
- Screenplay by: Bess Meredyth
- Produced by: Lloyd B. Carleton
- Starring: Dorothy Davenport; Emory Johnson
- Distributed by: Universal
- Release date: July 13, 1916
- Running time: 15–24 minutes (2 reels)
- Country: United States
- Language: English intertitles

No. 16 Martin Street was a 1916 American silent short film directed by Lloyd B. Carleton. The film was based on the detective story and screen adaptation by Bess Meredyth. The drama stars Dorothy Davenport, Emory Johnson, and an all-star cast of Universal contract players.

This story tells how a distinguished criminologist with the cooperation of a cabaret singer investigates a local homicide. In true detective style, the pair develops a series of planned undertakings attempting to snare the dope addicts and unravel the murder motive. The moviegoer sees first-hand the threat posed by the Dope evil. The partners find the critical evidence and solve the murder mystery. After solving the crime, the criminologist, along with the cabaret singer, becomes a crime-fighting unit.

Universal released the film on July 13, 1916.

== Plot ==
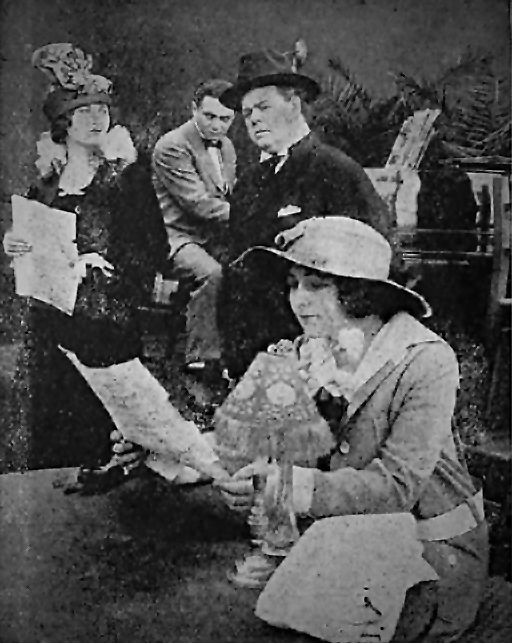
Cleo auditions at club

Cleo hopes to pursue a career in music. Attending the music conservatory has proved costly, and soon the expenses overwhelmed her. No longer able to afford her musical education, she drops out of school and returns home. Looking for a job, she reads a job advertisement for singers at the Follies Cabaret. She interviews for the job, and the show's manager hires her.

Jacques Fournier is one of the foremost criminologists (Note: "Criminologists are the people working and researching all of the ins and outs of criminology. Criminologists often look for behavioral patterns of a possible criminal in hopes of finding a particular perpetrator. They also conduct research and investigations, developing theories, and composing results, and more often than not solve crimes." quoted from Criminology) in the country. One day while researching a case, his office door flies open, and a man named Browne rushes into the office. He tells Fournier he has discovered his wife's dead body in their home. He pleads with Fournier to investigate this murder. Fournier agrees, and he accompanies the man to his home.

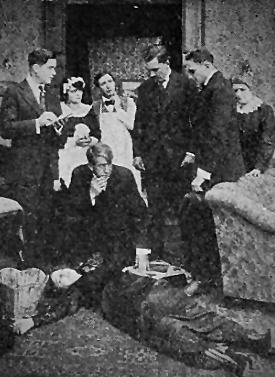
Mrs. Browne is dead

They enter the house and find Browne's wife lying dead on the floor. Browne points out all of her valuable jewels are missing. Upon further investigation, Fournier determines a spiess gun (Note: Adam W. Spies was a dealer in New York City, NY, in the mid-19th century. This gun reference probably refers to a distinctive percussion cap lock engraved with "A.W. Spies." These large-bore black powder weapons shot lead balls ranging from 52 to 57 caliber. A hunting rifle or pistol could use the Spies percussion lock. The bullet hole made with this weapon would leave a very distinctive entry wound in the human torso. The first clue is an easily identifiable big-bore gunshot wound.) was used to murder Mrs. Browne. He assures Browne he will investigate the matter and returns to his office. After checking his records, he learns Brown is a cocaine addict. (Note: Cocaine Addict In 1916, the term "Cocaine Fiend" was quite fashionable. The term was used in all the trade journal reviews of this film. Using "Cocaine addict" as a replacement phase seems a little less harsh to readers.) He also determines Mr. Browne, and a woman named Audrey Devine share a mysterious link. Audrey is a singer at the Follies Cabaret. Fournier decides he will talk to Devine and see if she can shed any light on the murder.

Between acts, they expected the cabaret performers to share drinks with the paying customers. Fournier enters the Follies Cabaret and sits down. He notices a patron is harassing one of the young performers. He strides over and rescues the girl from the man's advances. She thanks him profusely and tells him her name is Cleo. Cleo pours out her heart to Fournier, including why she had to abandon her studies at the conservatory. Fournier tells her she can earn some extra cash by assisting him with an investigation. Cleo readily agrees. He asks her if she knows Audrey Devine. Cleo tells Fournier she has seen her in the dressing room and knows Audrey is hooked on cocaine. Fournier thinks there might be a link between Browne and Audrey because of their mutual cocaine addiction. He asks Cleo to imitate a dope addict and to ask Audrey where she gets her dope.

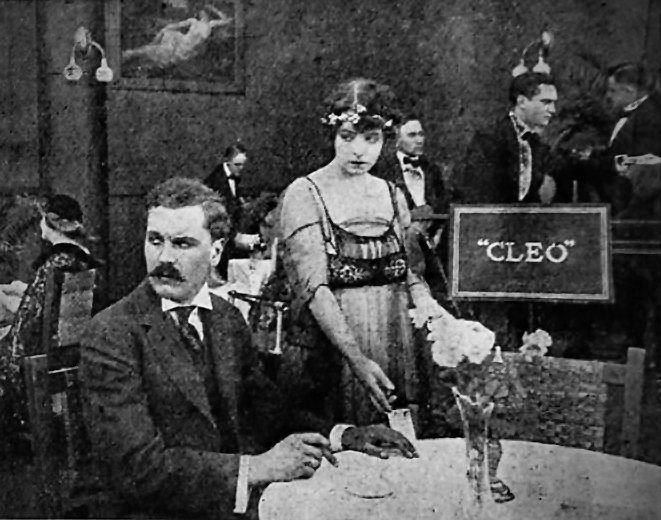
Cleo helping Fournier

The bell sounds, and Cleo returns to the stage for her second show. After the show's conclusion, she finds Audrey sitting alone. Cleo pretends she is desperate to get some cocaine. She asks Audrey if she knows anywhere she can get some coke. Audrey says she knows someone and calls Max the piano player. When they visit Max, he gives Cleo a deck of coke. (Note: Deck A "deck of cocaine" commonly refers to a single-dose packet, bag, or glassine envelope, of the drug.) Cleo later informs Fournier that Max is Audrey's drug source. Fournier devises a plan to determine Max's supplier. After working out the details, he leaves a note for Cleo. The note instructs her to make advances toward Max and persuades him to escort her to his home. While they are heading towards Max's home, Fournier will impersonate a crook and try to rob them. During the mugging, Fournier will force Max to identify his drug supplier. She follows his instructions to the letter, but a fight breaks out during the fake robbery attempt. Max escapes but leaves his coat on the ground. Fournier scrutinizes the coat and finds cocaine decks and a note addressed to "16 Martin Street."

Audrey arrives at a home on 16 Martin Street. She walks inside and greets Max and Joe. Joe turns out to be another cocaine addict. Both men are preparing decks of cocaine. Then Audrey goes through a secret panel and delivers some cocaine decks to someone waiting outside. Once finished with her work, she gets ready to leave.

On the same morning, Cleo, in disguise, heads out to 16 Martin Street. Cleo reaches the address, just as Audrey is just leaving, but Audrey does not recognize the disguised Cleo. When Cleo enters the room, she finds the room deserted.

Fournier has left her a powerful fake narcotic and skeleton key. He has instructed her to replace the fake narcotic for the cocaine. Since no one is around, she starts swapping the narcotic for the real dope. Completing her mission, she looks around the room. She discovers the secret panel and is about to investigate further when Joe returns. Cleo tells Joe she found they had left the panel door open, and she was merely peeking in. Cleo exits the house and goes home to preparations for her show that evening.

Night comes, and Fournier waits at the police station to see what Cleo has uncovered. While Fournier waits for Cleo, plainclothes men are watching 16 Martin Street. The plain cloth men observe Audrey and Max enter the house. After finishing her last show, Cleo goes directly to the police station. She meets Fournier and tells him everything she has discovered. They decide to head to 16 Martin Street immediately. Once they arrive, they surround the house, and Cleo leads them to the front door. They break down the door and find Max and Joe high on cocaine. The police arrest the two, then Cleo shows them the secret panel. After breaking into the private room, they find Audrey and Browne locked in an embrace. After a brief struggle, the police take Browne into custody. Cleo helps Fournier search the rest of the premises.

Cleo finds some loose boards on the floor, and after prying the boards, finds the weapon used to kill Mrs. Browne. Lying alongside the weapon are the dead woman's missing jewels. Fournier confronts Browne with the gun and missing gems. Seeing his story falling apart, Brown confesses to the murder of his wife. As a reward for her outstanding work in the field, Cleo becomes Fournier's associate.

== Cast ==
Actor	Role
Dorothy Davenport	Cleo
Emory Johnson	Jacques Fournier
Gretchen Lederer	Audrey Devine
Alfred Allen	Mr. Browne
Jack Abbot	Max

== Production ==
=== Pre-production ===
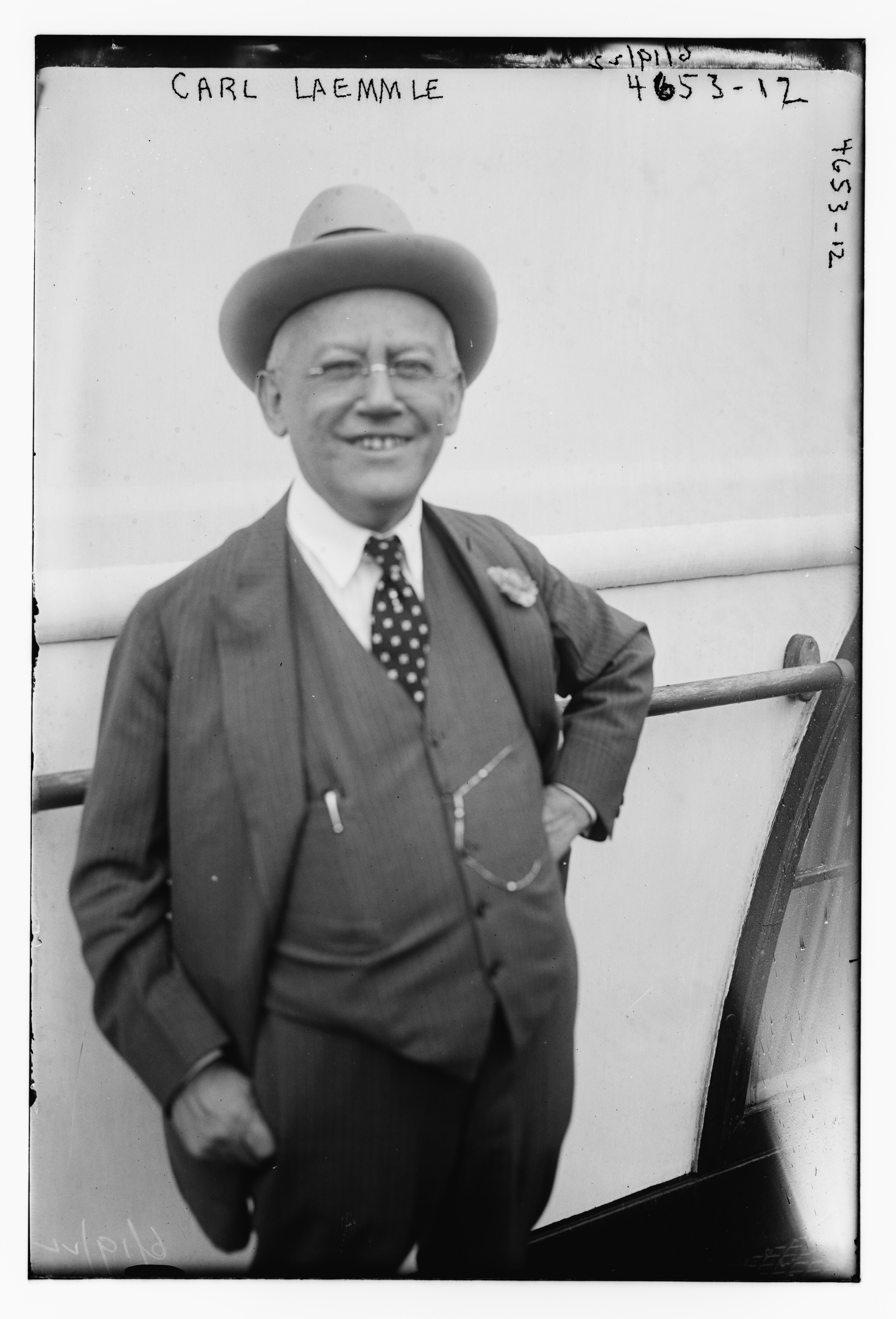
Carl Laemmle in 1918

Universal Logo 1915

In the book, "American Cinema's Transitional Era," the authors point out, The years between 1908 and 1917 witnessed what may have been the most significant transformation in American film history. During this "transitional era", widespread changes affected film form and film genres, filmmaking practices and industry structure, exhibition sites, and audience demographics. One aspect of this transition was the longer duration of films. Feature films (Note: A "feature film" or "feature-length film" is a narrative film (motion picture or "movie") with a running time long enough to be considered the principal or sole presentation in a commercial entertainment program. A film can be distributed as a feature film if it equals or exceeds a specified minimum running time and satisfies other defined criteria. The minimum time depends on the governing agency. The American Film Institute and the British Film Institute require films to have a minimum running time of forty minutes or longer. Other film agencies, e.g.,Screen Actors Guild, require a film's running time to be 60 minutes or greater. Currently, most feature films are between 70 and 210 minutes long.) were slowly becoming the standard fare for Hollywood producers. Before 1913, you could count the yearly features on two hands. Between 1915 and 1916, the number of feature movies rose 2 1/2 times or from 342 films to 835. There was a recurring claim that Carl Laemmle was the longest-running studio chief resisting the production of feature films. Universal was not ready to downsize its short film business because short films were cheaper, faster, and more profitable to produce than feature films. (Note: " Short Film" - There are no defined parameters for a Short film except for one immutable rule -the film's maximum running time. The Academy of Motion Picture Arts and Sciences defines a short film as "an original motion picture that has a running time of 40 minutes or less, including all credits".)

Laemmle would continue to buck this trend while slowly increasing his output of features. In 1914, Laemmle published an essay titled - Doom of long Features Predicted. In 1916, Laemmle ran an advertisement extolling Bluebird films while adding the following vocabulary on the top of the ad. (Note: The moving picture business is here to stay. That you must admit, despite carping critics and blundering sore-heads, true, some exhibitors have found business so good lately — but if you get down to facts when you look for a reason why, it's a 100 to 1 shot that they are, and for some time have been, dallying with a feature program. Some of these wise ones will tell you that business has picked up since they went into features, — BUT — ask them whether they are talking NET or GROSS. They will find they have an immediate appointment and terminate your queries unceremoniously. Funny how we like to kid ourselves, isn't it? The man who is packing 'em in and losing money on features is envied by his competitor, who is laying by a bit every day, and has a good steady, dependable patronage but admits to a few vacant seats at some performances. When this chap wakes up, he will realize that he has a gold mine and that good advertising will make it produce to capacity. The moral is that if you can tie up to the Universal Program, DO IT. If you can't NOW, watch your first chance. Let the people know what you have, and let the feature man go on to ruin if he wants to. You should worry! Motion Picture News - May 6, 1916) Universal made 91 feature films in 1916, including 44 Bluebirds and 47 Red Feather productions.

==== Development ====
The Dope Evil - July 14, 1913

The cocainist is much worse than the user of morphine because cocaine produces a kind of dementia which is expressed in a persecutional or suicidal mania. Cocaine leads to crime because:

1. cocaine is expensive
2. produces maniacal conditions in which homicide may be perpetrated
3. causes loss of moral and social sense

— Pamphlet published by the State of Maryland,

If Bess Meredyth needed inspiration for this movie's storyline, she needed to look no further than the pamphlet quoted in the box. The "Dope" evil was a scourge sweeping Hollywood and the country in 1916. Drug use and debauchery would peak in Hollywood in the 1920s. Hollywood made hundreds of films based on drug use and their associated crimes. The reader will notice this movie covered the pamphlet's cocaine warnings of "homicide" and "loss of moral and social sense."

==== Casting ====
All players in this film were under contract with Universal.

- Dorothy Davenport (1895-1977) was an established star for Universal when the 21 year-old actress played Cleo. She had acted in hundreds of movies by the time she starred in this film. The majority of these films were 2-reel shorts, as was the norm in Hollywood's teen years. She had been making movies since 1910. She started dating Wally Reid when she was barely 16, and he was 20. They married in 1913. After her husband died in 1923, she used the name "Mrs. Wallace Reid" in the credits for any project she took part in. Besides being an actress, she would eventually become a film director, producer, and writer. (Note: Dorothy and Drugs Unbeknown to Dorothy Davenport at the time, she would gain first-hand experience with the Dope evil three years after completing this film. Dorothy was still married to Wallace Reid in 1919 when he was injured in a train wreck while filming a movie. Reid needed six stitches to close a 3-inch scalp wound. To keep on filming, he was prescribed morphine to relieve his pain. Reid eventually became addicted to the drug but kept on working. Reid's morphine addiction worsened at a time when there was no type of drug rehabilitation programs. In 1923, he died in a sanatorium. Later in 1923, Dorothy Davenport co-produced and starred in the film Human Wreckage, which portrayed the dangers of drug addiction. Mrs. Wallace Reid would continue to tour the country, talking about the evils of dope addiction. quoted from Wallace Reid)
- Emory Johnson (1894-1960) was 22 years old when he starred in this movie as Jacques Fournier. Carl Laemmle of Universal Film Manufacturing Company thought he saw great potential in Johnson, so he chooses him to be Universal's new leading man. Laemmle's hope was Johnson would become another Wallace Reed. A major part of his plan was to create a movie couple that would sizzle on the silver screen. Laemmle thought Dorothy Davenport and Emory Johnson could create the chemistry he sought. Johnson and Davenport would complete 13 films together. They started with the successful feature production of Doctor Neighbor in May 1916 and ended with The Devil's Bondwoman in November 1916. After completing the last movie, Laemmle thought Johnson did not have the screen presence he wanted. He decided not to renew his contract. Johnson would make 17 movies in 1916, including 6 shorts and 11 feature-length Dramas. 1916 would become the second-highest movie output of his entire acting career. Emory acted in 25 films for Universal, mostly dramas with a sprinkling of comedies and westerns.
- Gretchen Lederer (1891-1955) was a 25 year-old actress when she landed this role as Audrey Devine. Lederer was a German actress getting her first start in 1912 with Carl Laemmle. At the time of this film, she was still a Universal contract actress. She had previously acted in two Bosworth-Johnson projects preceding this movie - The Yaqui and Two Men of Sandy Bar. She would unite with Emory Johnson in the 1916 productions of A Yoke of Gold and The Morals of Hilda.
- Alfred Allen (1866-1947) was 50 years old when he played Brown. He got his start in the film industry at Universal city in 1913. He landed his first role in 1915. His roles were character parts, and he played mostly fathers, villains, or ranch owners. Alfred Allen appeared in 69 features from 1916 through 1929. After making Heartaches, he would appear in four more Davenport-Johnson projects: A Yoke of Gold, The Unattainable, The Human Gamble and Barriers of Society.
- Jack Abbot (1886-1964) was 29 years old when he played Max. Jack was an actor, eventually becoming a writer and assistant director. The bulk of his roles during his acting career were in short subjects. He spent all of 1916 under contract with Universal. This role was his only known associateship with Lloyd B. Carleton production in 1916.

==== Director ====
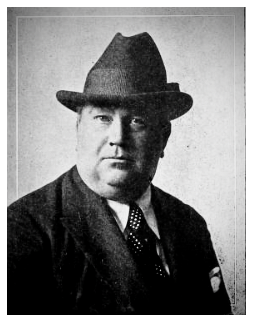
Director Lloyd B. Carleton

Lloyd B. Carleton (c. 1872–1933) started working for Carl Laemmle in the Fall of 1915. Carleton arrived with impeccable credentials, having directed some 60 films for the likes of Thanhouser, Lubin, Fox, and Selig.

Between March and December 1916, 44-year-old Lloyd Carleton directed 16 movies for Universal, starting with The Yaqui and ending with The Morals of Hilda released on December 11, 1916. Emory Johnson acted in all 16 of these films. Of Carleton's total 1916 output, 11 were feature films, and the rest were two-reel shorts. After Emory Johnson signed his Universal contract in early 1916, Carl Laemmle, the owner of Universal Pictures, thought he had found a new leading man. Laemmle was looking for a male lead like Wallace Reid. He also wanted to develop a cinematic pair that would captivate audiences.

Johnson became Laemmle's choice for his new leading man. Laemmle chose Dorothy Davenport to spark screen chemistry with Johnson. She was a Universal contract player who was Wallace Reid's wife. Universal's top director, Lloyd B. Carleton, was tasked by Laemmle to direct all of this pair's films.

The collaboration of Johnson and Davenport resulted in 13 films, beginning with the release of Doctor Neighbor in May 1916. The last film in the series was The Devil's Bondwoman, released in November 1916. The majority of the movies were feature films. All the films featured Johnson and Davenport as the main stars.

Davenport became pregnant in October 1916, and her film output dropped sharply in early 1917. In the end, Laemmle felt Johnson was not talented nor charismatic enough. He would not be Universal's version of Wally Reid. Laemmle felt that the films needed more screen chemistry, even if they made money. In June 1918, Universal failed to renew the contract of Emory Johnson.

The table below lists the 13 films Johnson and Davenport collaborated on.

◆ Films starring Emory Johnson and Dorothy Davenport in 1916 ◆
Title	Released	Director	Davenport role	Johnson role	Type	Time	LOC	Brand	Notes
Doctor Neighbor	1 May	Carleton	Hazel Rogers	Hamilton Powers	Drama	Feature	lost	Red Feather	
Her Husband's Faith	11 May	Carleton	Mabel Otto	Richard Otto	Drama	Short	lost	Universal	
Heartaches	18 May	Carleton	Virginia Payne	S Jackson Hunt	Drama	Short	lost	Universal	
Two Mothers	1 Jun	Carleton	Violetta Andree	2nd Husband	Drama	Short	lost	Universal	
Her Soul's Song	15 Jun	Carleton	Mary Salsbury	Paul Chandos	Drama	Short	lost	Universal	
The Way of the World	3 Jul	Carleton	Beatrice Farley	Walter Croyden	Drama	Feature	lost	Red Feather	
No. 16 Martin Street	13 Jul	Carleton	Cleo	Jacques Fournier	Drama	Short	lost	Universal	
A Yoke of Gold	14 Aug	Carleton	Carmen	Jose Garcia	Drama	Feature	lost	Red Feather	
The Unattainable	4 Sep	Carleton	Bessie Gale	Robert Goodman	Drama	Feature	1 of 5 reels	Bluebird	
Black Friday	18 Sep	Carleton	Elionor Rossitor	Charles Dalton	Drama	Feature	lost	Red Feather	
The Human Gamble	8 Oct	Carleton	Flavia Hill	Charles Hill	Drama	Short	lost	Universal	
Barriers of Society	10 Oct	Carleton	Martha Gorham	Westie Phillips	Drama	Feature	1 of 5 reels	Red Feather	
The Devil's Bondwoman	11 Nov	Carleton	Beverly Hope	Mason Van Horton	Drama	Feature	lost	Red Feather	

==== Screenplay ====
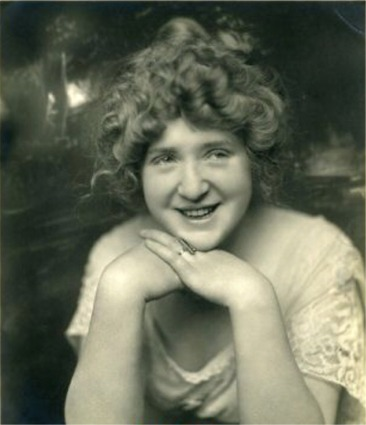
Screenwriter Bess Meredyth

Bess Meredyth (1890-1969) was 26 years old when she created the screenplay for this film. She would become one of the most successful women screenwriters of her time. She began as a short story writer for various newspapers, then became an extra at D.W. Griffith's Biograph Studios in New York. She moved to Los Angeles in 1911. Meredyth worked as an actress, subsidizing her income with screenwriting. She wrote stories or screenplays for 24 movies in 1916. Between 1914 and 1920, she wrote two hundred original stories while she worked at Universal. It should also be noted; she was one of the original 36 founders of the Academy of Motion Picture Arts and Sciences.

=== Filming ===
On March 15, 1915, Laemmle opened the world's largest motion picture production facility, Universal City Studios. Since this film required no location shooting, it was filmed in its entirety at the new studio complex.

==== Working title ====
When films enter production, they need the means to reference the project. A Working title is assigned to the project. A Working Title can also be named an Alternate title. In many cases, a working title will become the release title.
Working titles are used primarily for two reasons:

- An official title for the project has not been determined
- A non-descript title to mask the real reason for making the movie.

The official copyrighted title of this photoplay is No. 16 Martin Street.

There is no known reference of the working title for this film. There are newspapers and magazine listings of:

- Number 16 Martin Place
- No. 16 Martin Place
- 16 Martin Street

=== Post production ===
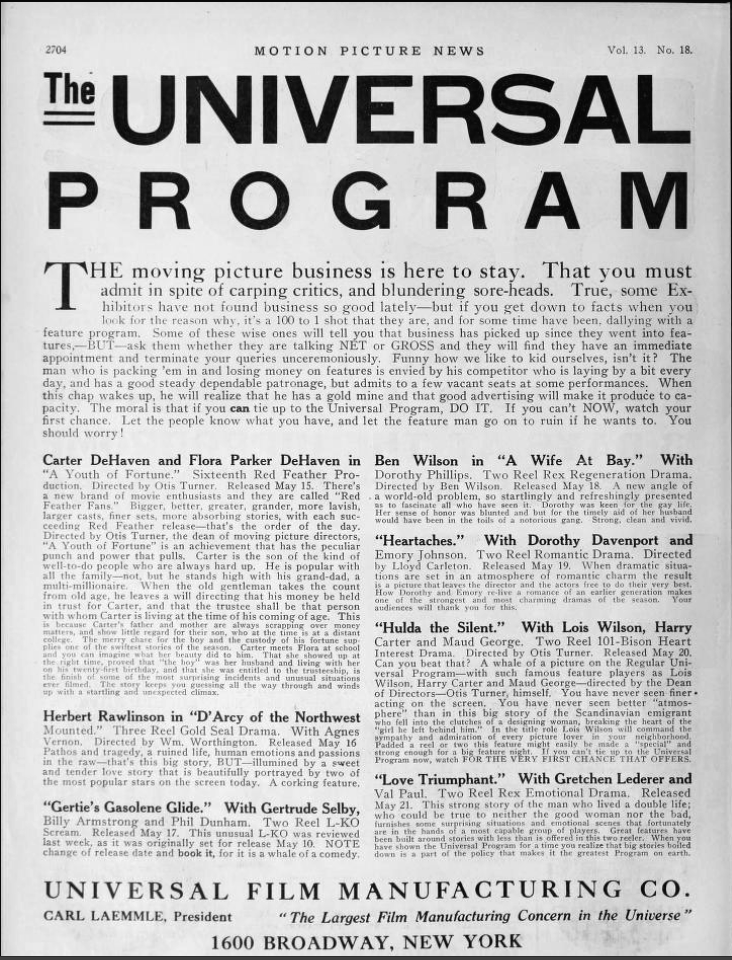
1916 Universal Ad the future of short films

Based on an American Film Institute standard, films with a running time of forty minutes or longer are considered feature films.

By 1915, feature films were starting to become more the trend in Hollywood. While advertising this film, a Universal ad is shown in the graphic, also expounds on short films. (Note: The moving picture business is here to stay. That you must admit despite carping critics and blundering sore-heads. True, some exhibitors have found business so good lately — but if you get down to facts when you look for the reason why, it's a 100 to 1 shot that they are, and for some time have been, dallying with a feature program. Some of these wise ones will tell you that business has picked up since they went into features, — BUT — ask them whether they are talking NET or GROSS. They will find they have an immediate appointment and terminate your queries unceremoniously. Funny how we like to kid ourselves, isn't it? The man who is packing 'em in and losing money on features is envied by his competitor, who is laying by a bit every day, and has a good steady, dependable patronage but admits to a few vacant seats at some performances. When this chap wakes up, he will realize that he has a gold mine and that good advertising will make it produce to capacity. The moral is that if you can tie up to the Universal Program, DO IT. If you can't NOW, watch your first chance. Let the people know what you have, and let the feature man go on to ruin if he wants to. You should worry!)

==== Music ====
As part of Universal's in-house publication The Moving Picture Weekly, a section was devoted to proposing musical selections for specific movies. The musical selections were "Specially Selected and Compiled by M. Winkler." The music recommended for this film were:

LAEMMLE— "No. 16 Martin Street"....(Two Reels)
REEL I.
1. "Esperanza," by Johnstone, until scene, "Newspaper clipping.
2. "Melody," by Friml, until the cabaret scene.
3. "Oh, My Love," by Monaco, until scene, "Stage entrance."
4. "InCupid'sNet," Armand.
REEL II.
5. Continue "In Cupid's Net" until "Closing time."
6. "Dream Shadows," by Langey, to action, pp. or ff., until scene, "No. 16 Martin Street."
7. "Agitato, No. 6," by Lake, pp. until the end.

== Release and reception ==
=== Official release ===
The copyright was filed with U.S. Copyright Office on July 3, 1916 and entered into the record as shown: (Note: The copyright was filed with U.S. Copyright Office and entered into the record as shown: NO. 16 MARTIN STREET. Laemmle. 1916. 2 reels. Credits: Bess Meredyth; producer, Lloyd B. Carleton. (c)Universal Film Mfg. Co., Inc.; 3Jul16; LP8634) and officially released on July 13, 1916.

=== Advertising ===
In Universal's trade journal magazine, The Moving Picture Weekly a new advertising section was started titled - PUTTING IT OVER. The section heading reads as follows:

Are you "Putting 'em Over," friend Exhibitor? Are you taking advantage of this new department of advertising suggestions and making a noise in your town that echoes in the tinkle of coins at the box office?

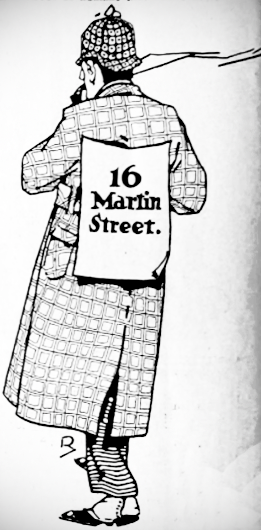
Advertisement illustration in The Moving Picture Weekly

The July 1, 1916 issue of The Moving Picture Weekly had the following advertising suggestions for 16 Martin Street:

"A detective story that immediately suggests a Sherlock Holmes make-up as illustrated. Get a man dressed in a long and loud Ulster coat or Mackintosh, with a long mustache, a fore-and-aft cap, a big pipe, and a placard on his back with the name of the photoplay as shown. On his breast, let him show a placard with your theatre name and date. People will see that first as they meet him, and they will turn to rubber, getting a flash at the title then."

In 1916, short films were shown in conjunction with other short films to create a "diversified program" and were typically advertised only with a short synopsis. The newspaper ad displayed in the film's infobox shows No. 16 Martin Street playing with two other films. The details of the other two films are:

- Adele Farrington and Pat Rooney starring the one-reel comedy The Belle & the Bell Hop.
- Lucille Young and Jack Nelson starring the one-reel drama A Man's Hardest Fight.

=== Reviews ===
Lengthy detailed reviews for short films were not commonplace in 1916. The trade journals devoted lengthy critical reviews, and detailed plot outlines to feature films while giving short films abbreviated summaries and reviews. Unlike other short movies, No. 16 Martin Street was favored with several long film reviews. Critical reaction to the film seemed mostly favorable, as seen below.

In the July 15, 1916 issue of the Moving Picture News, quoted from the Tabloid Reviews for the Busy Exhibitor:

"Detective pictures, much on the order of detective stories, are either good or bad - there is no between. No. 16 Martin Street is good. It holds the attention every minute, which is the best thing that can be said of it."

In the July 15, 1916 issue of The Moving Picture World, quoted from the section - Comments on the Films - Exclusively by our own Staff:

"Dorothy Davenport does pleasing work as the girl who aids the detective. The story deals with sordid types but is well handled and makes altogether quite a strong offering."

In the July 8, 1916 issue of The Moving Picture Weekly, a review published in the Universal weekly film periodical states:

"NO. 16 MARTIN ST. combines two significant phases of modern life; one is the rise of the science of criminology, and the other the prevalence of a new vice, the "dope" evil. In this picture, the "movie fan" is given a treat that has long been known to the readers of A. Conan Doyle and Craig Kennedy. In addition, the cover of metropolitan life is ripped off, and the seamy side is laid bare. A drama of vice and crime and their detection."

== Preservation status ==
Many silent-era films did not survive for reasons as explained on this Wikipedia page. (Note: Film is history. With every foot of film lost, we lose a link to our culture, the world around us, each other, and ourselves. – Martin Scorsese, filmmaker, director NFPF Board A report by Library of Congress film historian and archivist David Pierce estimates that: around 75% of original silent-era films have perished; 14% of the 10,919 silent films released by major studios exist in their original 35 mm or other formats; 11% survive only in full-length foreign versions or film formats of lesser image quality.)

According to the Library of Congress, all known copies of this film are lost.

== Gallery ==
The Players

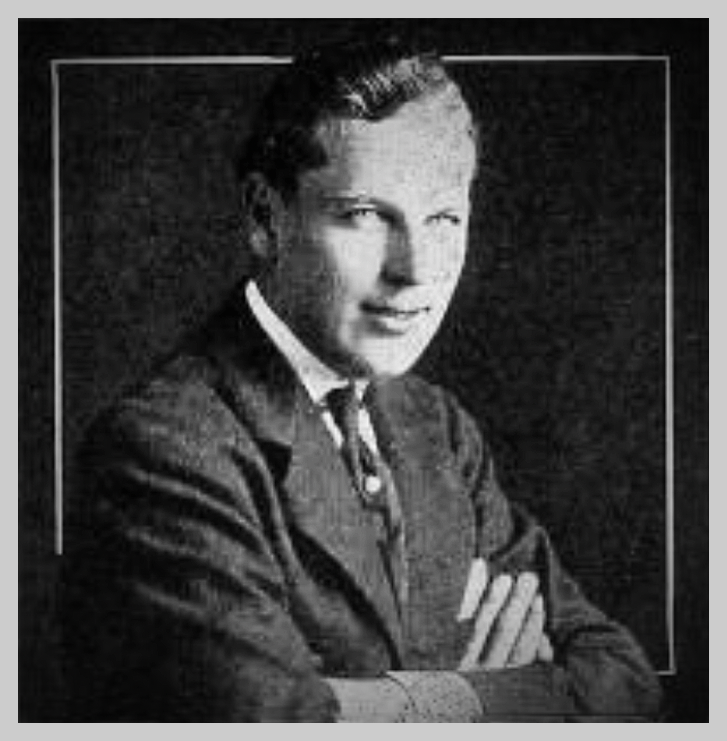
Johnson 1916
Jacques Fournier

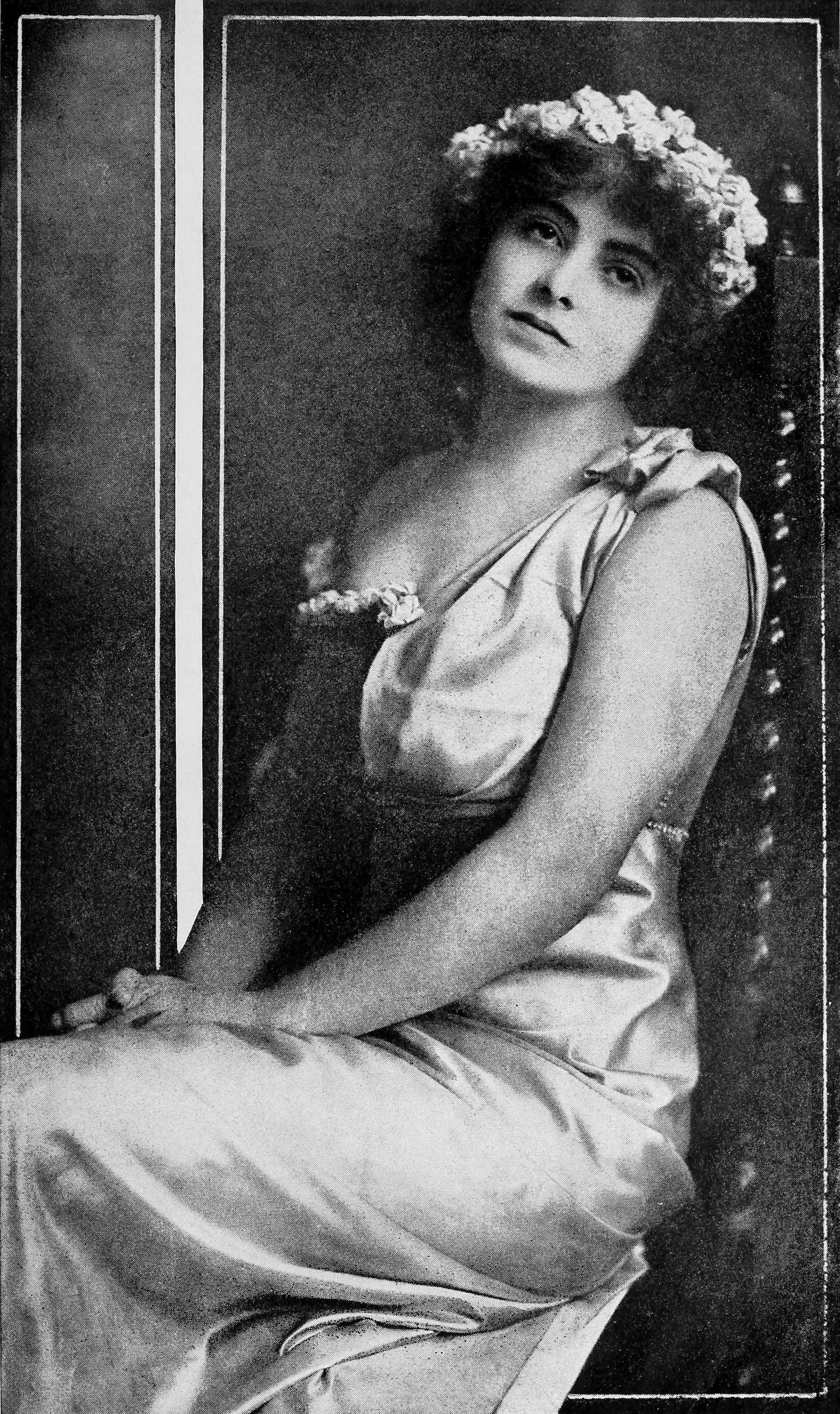
Davenport 1916
Cleo

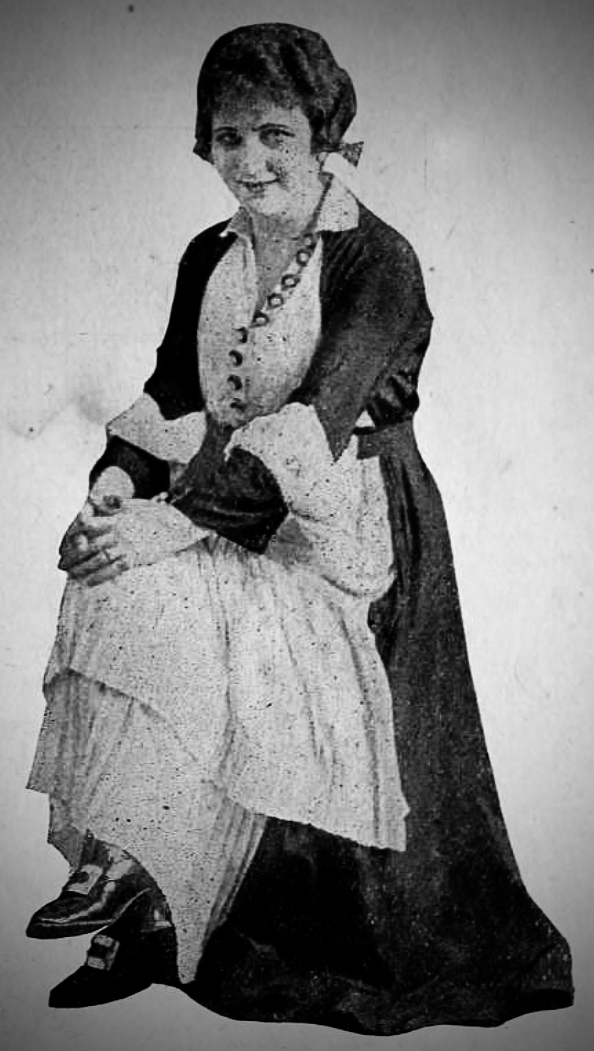
Lederer 1916
Audrey Devine

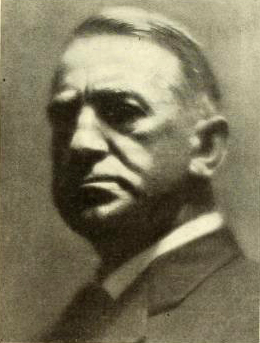
Allen 1919
Brown

== Sources ==
- Braff, R.E. (1999). The Universal Silents: A Filmography of the Universal Motion Picture Manufacturing Company, 1912-1929. McFarland. ISBN 978-0-7864-0287-8.
- Carey, A.M. (1953). American Firearms Makers: When, Where, and What They Made from the Colonial Period to the End of the Nineteenth Century. Crowell.
- Fleming, E.J. (2010). Wallace Reid: The Life and Death of a Hollywood Idol. McFarland. ISBN 978-0-7864-8266-5.
- Hirschhorn, Clive (1983). The Universal Story - The Complete History of the Studio and its 2,641 films. New York: Crown Publishing Group. pp. 22–23. ISBN 0-517-55001-6.
- Katchmer, G.A. (2015). A Biographical Dictionary of Silent Film Western Actors and Actresses. McFarland, Incorporated, Publishers. ISBN 978-1-4766-0905-8.
- Keil, C.; Stamp, S. (2004). American Cinema's Transitional Era: Audiences, Institutions, Practices. ACLS Humanities E-Book. University of California Press. ISBN 978-0-520-24027-8.
- McClure's Magazine (1917). McClure's Magazine. S.S. McClure, Limited. p. 62.
