= Her Husband's Faith =

1916 movie by Lloyd B. Carleton

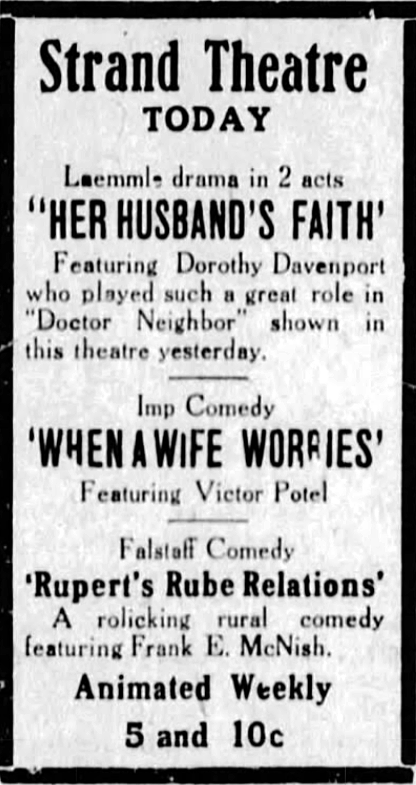
- 1916 Newspaper Theatre Ad
- Directed by: Lloyd B. Carleton
- Written by: Paul Machette
- Screenplay by: Eugene De Rue
- Produced by: Lloyd B. Carleton
- Starring: Dorothy Davenport; Emory Johnson
- Production company: Universal
- Distributed by: Universal
- Release date: May 11, 1916
- Running time: 15–24 minutes (2 reels)
- Country: United States
- Language: English intertitles

Her Husband's Faith is a 1916 American silent short film directed by Lloyd B. Carleton. The film is based on a story by Paul Machette. Eugene De Rue developed the screenplay. This domestic society drama's features Dorothy Davenport, T. D. Crittenden and Emory Johnson.

The story revolves around Richard and Mabel Otto. They are happily married and have a three-year-old son. The couple holds a reception at their home when a drifter shows up at the front door. Suddenly, things start to unravel when the stranger reveals secrets about Mabel's shadowy past. The couple's survival will depend on Richard's faith in his wife.

The film was released on May 11, 1916, by Universal.

== Plot ==
Richard Otto and his wife, Mabel, have a joyful marriage and live in a spacious home. They have a three-year-old boy whom both parents adore. One day, Mabel says to her husband: "Five blissful years of marriage, a beautiful home, a tender husband, and a darling baby — surely God has been good to me." Richard and Mabel Otto decide to throw a big reception to celebrate their good fortune. The couple sends invitations and places an announcement in the local newspaper.

The scene shifts to a local park where a drifter named Tom Willis sits on a park bench. While reading the local newspaper, he notices the article announcing Otto's reception. The item contains a picture of Mable Otto, and he recognizes her as someone from his murky past. He believes Mabel was his former partner in crime when they traveled in the criminal underworld. At some point, she left him, and Willis never saw her again. Seeing Mabel's picture stirs up old emotions, and he wants to reconnect.

Mr. and Mrs. Otto's reception is in full swing. Several guests are doting on the young boy when his bedtime arrives. Mabel takes the boy to his bedroom and puts him to sleep. When she returns to the party, she tells Richard all the tricks the little one had learned. However, the young boy still can't sleep and rings the bell for his mother. Both parents dutifully leave their guests and try to put the boy to sleep. A domestic enters the bedroom and informs Richard a caller was waiting at the front door. He leaves to greet his guest.

Richard opens the front door and immediately recognizes Tom Willis. Willis was a man whom Otto had once helped with a small loan. Willis tells Otto he is down on his luck again and needs another loan. Richard invites Tom into the house. After they are comfortable, Willis tells Richard a story about his past relationship with a woman in the criminal underground. After describing how deeply in love he was, he states he would do anything to win her back. Richard seems to sympathize with Tom's story of lost love. Willis then tells Otto the love story's mystery woman is Mabel Otto. Richard reels in shock and tells Tom—they have a healthy marriage, share a son, and have a wonderful life. Then Otto emphatically tells Willis he should never come to their house again or ever attempt to meet his wife.

Willis had checked out the house and its contents during their previous conversation. He leaves Otto's home but returns later to steal valuable jewelry. During the attempted burglary, Mable and her son stumble upon the attempted theft. Mable sees Tom and remembers him from her past. Hearing the commotion, Richard rushes to the room. The tension rises, but when Willis sees them all together, he takes one last glance at Mabel and flees without saying a word.

Richard tells Mable the man had asked for money and then concocted some cock-and-bull story about her being an underworld member. He also mentioned Willis believed Mable was part of that past underworld connection. Richard states he never accepted the Willis story and completely believed in his wife's version of her past. Her husband's faith in his wife's version of her past prevailed.

== Cast ==
| Actor | Role |
|---|---|
| Dorothy Davenport | Mabel Otto |
| Emory Johnson | Richard Otto |
| Trookwood D. Crittenden | Tom Willis |
| Frankie Lee | Otto's 3-year-old son |

== Production ==
=== Pre production ===
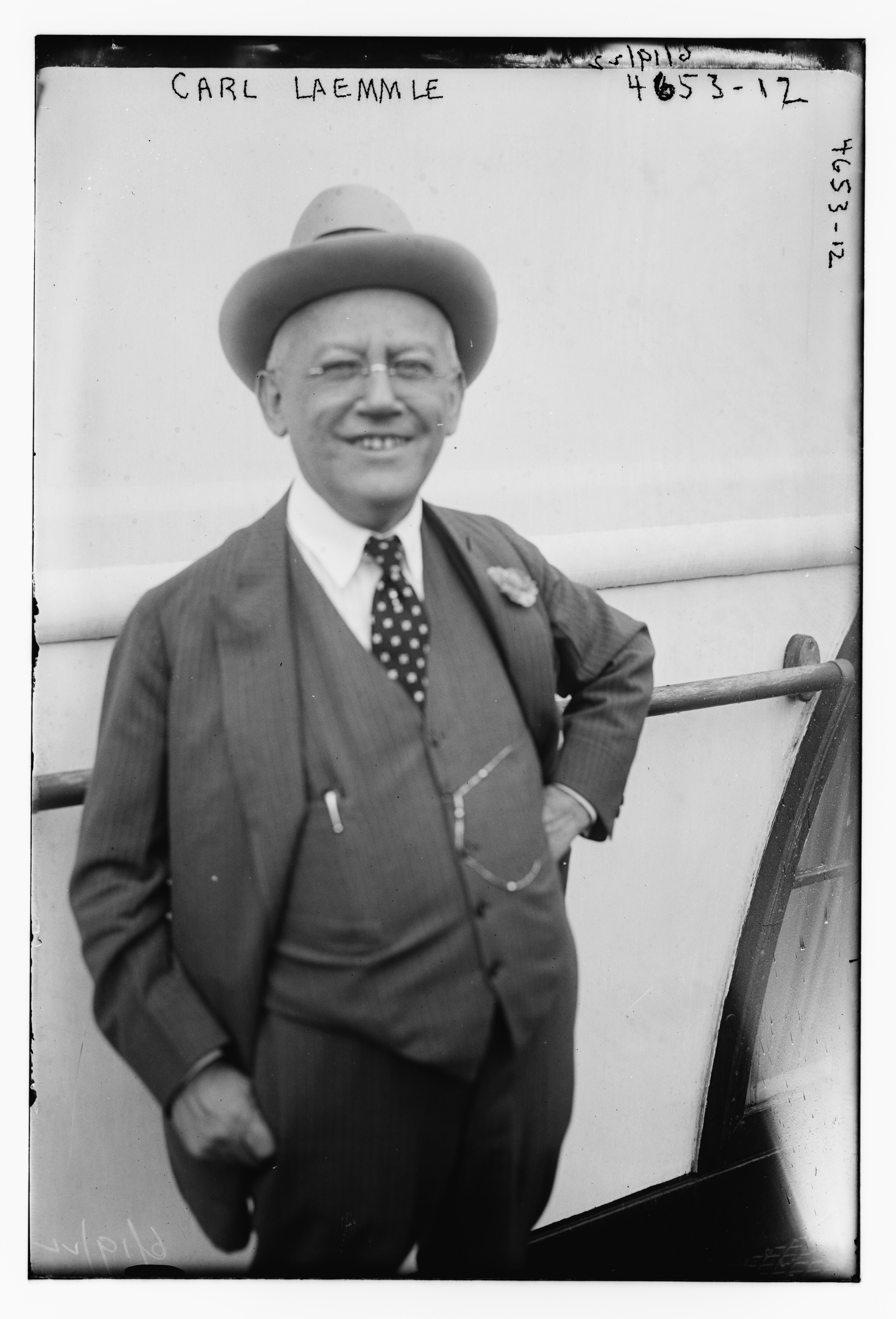
Carl Laemmle in 1918

Universal Logo 1915

In the book, "American Cinema's Transitional Era," the authors point out, The years between 1908 and 1917 witnessed what may have been the most significant transformation in American film history. During this "transitional era", widespread changes affected film form and film genres, filmmaking practices and industry structure, exhibition sites, and audience demographics. One aspect of this transition was the longer duration of films. Feature films (Note: A "feature film" or "feature-length film" is a narrative film (motion picture or "movie") with a running time long enough to be considered the principal or sole presentation in a commercial entertainment program. A film can be distributed as a feature film if it equals or exceeds a specified minimum running time and satisfies other defined criteria. The minimum time depends on the governing agency. The American Film Institute and the British Film Institute require films to have a minimum running time of forty minutes or longer. Other film agencies, e.g.,Screen Actors Guild, require a film's running time to be 60 minutes or greater. Currently, most feature films are between 70 and 210 minutes long.) were slowly becoming the standard fare for Hollywood producers. Before 1913, you could count the yearly features on two hands. Between 1915 and 1916, the number of feature movies rose 2 1/2 times or from 342 films to 835. There was a recurring claim that Carl Laemmle was the longest-running studio chief resisting the production of feature films. Universal was not ready to downsize its short film business because short films were cheaper, faster, and more profitable to produce than feature films. (Note: " Short Film" - There are no defined parameters for a Short film except for one immutable rule -the film's maximum running time. The Academy of Motion Picture Arts and Sciences defines a short film as "an original motion picture that has a running time of 40 minutes or less, including all credits".)

Laemmle would continue to buck this trend while slowly increasing his output of features. In 1914, Laemmle published an essay titled - Doom of long Features Predicted. In 1915, Laemmle ran an advertisement extolling Bluebird films while adding the following vocabulary on the top of the ad. (Note: The moving picture business is here to stay. That you must admit, despite carping critics and blundering sore-heads, true, some exhibitors have found business so good lately — but if you get down to facts when you look for a reason why, it's a 100 to 1 shot that they are, and for some time have been, dallying with a feature program. Some of these wise ones will tell you that business has picked up since they went into features, — BUT — ask them whether they are talking NET or GROSS. They will find they have an immediate appointment and terminate your queries unceremoniously. Funny how we like to kid ourselves, isn't it? The man who is packing 'em in and losing money on features is envied by his competitor, who is laying by a bit every day, and has a good steady, dependable patronage but admits to a few vacant seats at some performances. When this chap wakes up, he will realize that he has a gold mine and that good advertising will make it produce to capacity. The moral is that if you can tie up to the Universal Program, DO IT. If you can't NOW, watch your first chance. Let the people know what you have, and let the feature man go on to ruin if he wants to. You should worry! Motion Picture News - May 6, 1916) Carl Laemmle released 100 feature-length films in 1916, as stated in Clive Hirschhorn's book, The Universal Story.

==== Casting ====
- Dorothy Davenport (1895–1977) was an established star for Universal when the 21 year-old actress played Mabel Otto. She had acted in hundreds of movies by the time she starred in this film. Most of these films were 2-reel shorts, as was the norm in Hollywood's teen years. She had been making movies since 1910. She started dating Wally Reid when she was barely 16, and he was 20. They married in 1913. After her husband died in 1923, she used the name "Mrs. Wallace Reid" in the credits for any project she took part in. Besides being an actress, she would eventually become a film director, producer, and writer.
- Emory Johnson (1894–1960) was 22 years old when he acted in this movie as Richard Otto. In January 1916, Emory signed a contract with Universal Film Manufacturing Company. Carl Laemmle of Universal Film Manufacturing Company thought he saw great potential in Johnson, so he chose him to be Universal's new leading man. Laemmle's hope was Johnson would become another Wallace Reed. A major part of his plan was to create a movie couple that would sizzle on the silver screen. Laemmle thought Dorothy Davenport and Emory Johnson could create the chemistry he sought. Johnson and Davenport would complete 13 films together. They started with the successful feature production of Doctor Neighbor in May 1916 and ended with The Devil's Bondwoman in November 1916. After completing the last movie, Laemmle thought Johnson did not have the screen presence he wanted. He decided not to renew his contract. Johnson would make 17 movies in 1916, including 6 shorts and 11 feature-length Dramas. 1916 would become the second-highest movie output of his entire acting career. Emory acted in 25 films for Universal, mostly dramas with a sprinkling of comedies and westerns.
- Frankie Lee (1911–1970) had made his acting debut in the 1916 Universal production of Her Greatest Story. Lee was 4 years old when he appeared in this film. This release would be his second film performance and his acting debut with Emory Johnson. Both actors would unite again at the end of 1916 in the Universal production of The Right to Be Happy. Lee would also appear in the 1922 Emory Johnson-directed picture The Third Alarm.
  Frankie was also the older brother of Davey Lee, another child actor. Frankie made his last film appearance in the 1925 production of The Golden Strain which starred Hobart Bosworth and Madge Bellamy. He appeared in 56 films between 1916 and 1925.
- T. D. Crittenden (1878–1938) was 37 years-old when he played the heavy, Tom Willis. He appeared in 69 films between 1912 and 1924, and he made 22 movies in 1916, of which 5 were features.

==== Director ====
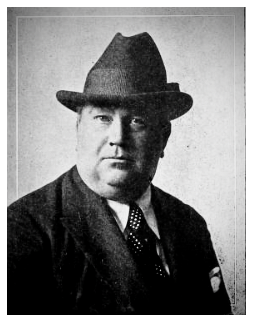
Director Lloyd B. Carleton

Lloyd B. Carleton (c. 1872–1933) started working for Carl Laemmle in the Fall of 1915. Carleton arrived with impeccable credentials, having directed some 60 films for the likes of Thanhouser, Lubin, Fox, and Selig.

Between March and December 1916, 44-year-old Lloyd Carleton directed 16 movies for Universal, starting with The Yaqui and ending with The Morals of Hilda. Emory Johnson acted in all 16 of these films. Of Carleton's total 1916 output, 11 were feature films, and the rest were two-reel shorts. After Emory Johnson signed his Universal contract in early 1916, Carl Laemmle, the owner of Universal Pictures, thought he had found a new leading man. Laemmle was looking for a male lead like Wallace Reid. He also wanted to develop a cinematic pair that would captivate audiences.

Johnson became Laemmle's choice for his new leading man. Laemmle chose Dorothy Davenport to spark screen chemistry with Johnson. She was a Universal contract player who was Wallace Reid's wife. Universal's top director, Lloyd B. Carleton, was tasked by Laemmle to direct all of this pair's films.

The collaboration of Johnson and Davenport resulted in 13 films, beginning with the release of Doctor Neighbor in May 1916. The last film in the series was The Devil's Bondwoman, released in November 1916. The majority of the movies were feature films. All the films featured Johnson and Davenport as the main stars.

Davenport became pregnant in October 1916, and her film output dropped sharply in early 1917. In the end, Laemmle felt Johnson was not talented nor charismatic enough. He would not be Universal's version of Wally Reid. Laemmle felt that the films needed more screen chemistry, even if they made money. In June 1918, Universal failed to renew the contract of Emory Johnson.

The table below lists the 13 films Johnson and Davenport collaborated on.

◆ Films starring Emory Johnson and Dorothy Davenport in 1916 ◆
| Title | Released | Director | Davenport role | Johnson role | Type | Time | LOC | Brand | Notes |
|---|---|---|---|---|---|---|---|---|---|
| Doctor Neighbor | 1 May | Carleton | Hazel Rogers | Hamilton Powers | Drama | Feature | lost | Red Feather | |
| Her Husband's Faith | 11 May | Carleton | Mabel Otto | Richard Otto | Drama | Short | lost | Universal | |
| Heartaches | 18 May | Carleton | Virginia Payne | S Jackson Hunt | Drama | Short | lost | Universal | |
| Two Mothers | 1 Jun | Carleton | Violetta Andree | 2nd Husband | Drama | Short | lost | Universal | |
| Her Soul's Song | 15 Jun | Carleton | Mary Salsbury | Paul Chandos | Drama | Short | lost | Universal | |
| The Way of the World | 3 Jul | Carleton | Beatrice Farley | Walter Croyden | Drama | Feature | lost | Red Feather | |
| No. 16 Martin Street | 13 Jul | Carleton | Cleo | Jacques Fournier | Drama | Short | lost | Universal | |
| A Yoke of Gold | 14 Aug | Carleton | Carmen | Jose Garcia | Drama | Feature | lost | Red Feather | |
| The Unattainable | 4 Sep | Carleton | Bessie Gale | Robert Goodman | Drama | Feature | 1 of 5 reels | Bluebird | |
| Black Friday | 18 Sep | Carleton | Elionor Rossitor | Charles Dalton | Drama | Feature | lost | Red Feather | |
| The Human Gamble | 8 Oct | Carleton | Flavia Hill | Charles Hill | Drama | Short | lost | Universal | |
| Barriers of Society | 10 Oct | Carleton | Martha Gorham | Westie Phillips | Drama | Feature | 1 of 5 reels | Red Feather | |
| The Devil's Bondwoman | 11 Nov | Carleton | Beverly Hope | Mason Van Horton | Drama | Feature | lost | Red Feather | |

==== Screenplay ====
Eugene De Rue (1885–1985) developed the screenplay based on a story by Paul Machette (1874–1927). Both writers were actors and directors.

=== Filming ===
On March 15, 1915, Laemmle opened the world's largest motion picture production facility, Universal City Studios. Since this film required no location shooting, it was filmed in its entirety at the new studio complex.

There is no published record of when filming began. An item published in the Motion Picture News on April 22, 1916, stated:

"The Lloyd B. Carleton Company has just completed the filming of "Her Husband's Faith." This announcement is consistent with the film's release on May 11, 1916.

==== Working title ====
When films enter production, they need the means to reference the project. A Working title is assigned to the project. A Working Title can also be named an Alternate title. In many cases, a working title will become the release title.
Working titles are used primarily for two reasons:

- An official title for the project has not been determined
- A non-descript title to mask the real reason for making the movie.

The working title for this film was – Her Husband's Honor.

==== Similar titles ====
Similar films are described under different titles using a cast, length, plot, producer, release date, and "Her Husband's Faith" title as a reference point.

- In the June 1915 issue of Kalem Kalendar, a brief review of "Her Husband's Honor" was released by Kalem on June 7, 1915. The short film stars Henry Pemberton and Elsie McLeod. The plot involves a women's desire for adventure leads to the smuggling of diamonds. The same listing can be seen on the IMDb database. There is no listing of any copyright filed for this film.
- In the May 13, 1916, issue of Motography listed under "Universal Programs," there is a brief review of "Her Husband's Honor." The cast, length, plot, producer, and release date are identical to Her Husband's Faith, except the title is different. The same issue of Motography also lists under the heading "Complete Record of Current Films," a correct film Length, Producer, Release Date, and Title. No Cast or plot is shown.
- In the May 13, 1916, issue of Moving Picture World, there is an identical listing to the Motography review, i.e., the cast, length, plot, producer, and release date are the same, except for the use of the working title - "Her Husband's Honor."
- In the May 20, 1916 issue of Motography, under "Universal Programs," there is an amended listing of "Her Husband's Honor." This review shows a short film featuring Ben Wilson and Dorothy Phillips with a release date of May 18, 1916. This Rex produced film has a plot of a lawyer's wife attempting to sell valuable documents. There is no listing of any copyright filed for this film.
  However, we see a new listing of "A Wife at Bay." This short film stars Ben Wilson and Dorothy Phillips with a release date of May 20, 1916, by Rex Motion Picture Company (Note: Rex is one of the companies that merged with Universal in 1912). The plot involves a lawyer's wife attempting to sell valuable documents. This film has a listing on the IMDb and a copyright This film is identical to the Motography listing of "Her Husband's Honor."
- Lastly, Her Husband's Honor was a feature film released by Mutual Film on August 5, 1918, and involved a frivolous socialite entangled in shady business dealings. It starred David Powell and Edna Goodrich. There is a IMDb listing. and a copyright was filed.

== Release and reception ==
=== Official release ===
The film was copyrighted on May 3, 1916 (Note: The copyright was filed with U.S. Copyright Office and entered into the record as shown: HER HUSBAND'S FAITH. Laemmle. 1916. 2 reels. Credits: Producer, Lloyd Carleton; story, Paul Machette;scenario, Eugene DeRue. (c)Universal Film Mfg. Co., Inc.; 3May16; LP8210) and officially released on May 11, 1916.

=== Advertising ===
By 1915, feature films were becoming more the trend in Hollywood. However, Universal wasn't ready to downsize its short film business. Short films were cheaper and faster to produce than feature films. While advertising short films, Universal might include a section titled–"' The Universal Programs'" above the movie ads, espousing the advantages of continuing to show short films. (Note: "The moving picture business is here to stay. Some of these wise ones will tell you that business has picked up since they went into features, — BUT — ask them whether they are talking NET or GROSS. The man who is packing 'em in and losing money on features is envied by his competitor, who is laying by a bit every day, and has a good steady, dependable patronage but admits to a few vacant seats at some performances. When this chap wakes up, he will realize that he has a gold mine and that good advertising will make it produce to capacity. The moral is that if you can tie up to the Universal Program, DO IT. If you can't NOW, watch your first chance. Let the people know what you have and let the feature man go on to ruin if he wants to.")

In 1916, short films were shown in conjunction with other short films to create a "diversified program" and were typically advertised only with a short synopsis. A newspaper ad shows Her Husband's Faith playing along with two short comedies:

- Victor Potel starring in When a Wife Worries.
- Frank E. McNish starring in Rupert's Rube Relation.

=== Reviews ===
In the May 13, 1916 issue of the Motion Picture News, a reviewer opines:

"Emory Johnson, Dorothy Davenport, and Trockwood Crittenden are the leads in this averagely strong release. Miss Davenport adds much to the picture. Lloyd B. Carleton directed."

In the June 3, 1916, issue of The Wilmington Morning Star, an article reads:

"Dorothy Davenport makes her first reappearance in Universal Picture's great two real hard-throbbing dramatic master picture, "Her Husband's Faith," costarring with Emery Johnson. "Her Husband's Faith" is one of the deepest emotional, dramatic gems of the entire week. There is the tremor of expectancy at different periods as you hope the differences will be settled; there is that pathos that marks the true dramatic gem all the way through the two reels, with beautiful Dorothy Davenport, more fascinating and lovable than ever and one of her strongest emotional roles."

In the June 13, 1916, issue of The Tampa Tribune, an article states:

"Dorothy Davenport, starring in Her Husband's Faith, gives an unusually brilliant performance as a wife with the past that confronts her after she thought it lived down. Confronted by her old lover of the underworld and her husband, she successfully holds the affections of the latter and brings a thrilling scene to a happy ending."

== Preservation status ==
Many silent-era films did not survive for reasons as explained on this Wikipedia page. (Note: Film is history. With every foot of film lost, we lose a link to our culture, the world around us, each other, and ourselves. – Martin Scorsese, filmmaker, director NFPF Board A report by Library of Congress film historian and archivist David Pierce estimates that: around 75% of original silent-era films have perished; 14% of the 10,919 silent films released by major studios exist in their original 35 mm or other formats; 11% survive only in full-length foreign versions or film formats of lesser image quality.)

According to the Library of Congress, all known copies of this film are lost.

== Gallery ==
The Players and Director

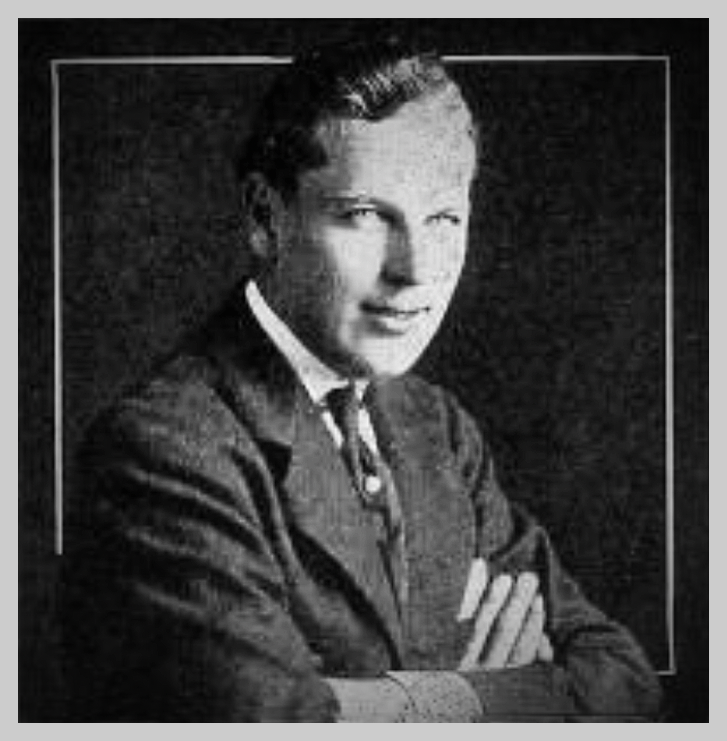
Emory Johnson
1916

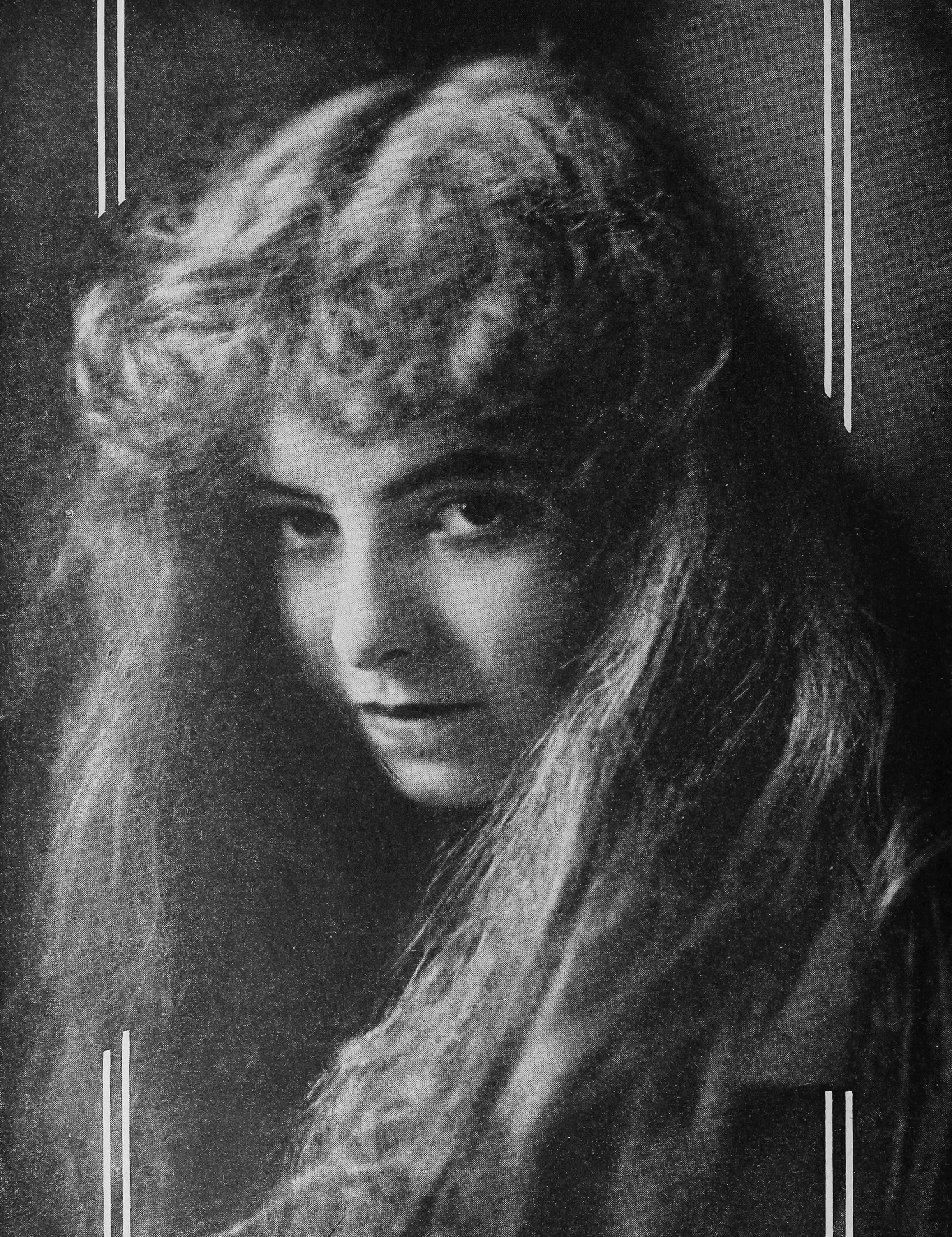
Dorothy Davenport
1914

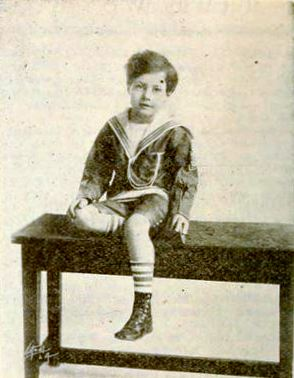
Frankie Lee
1919

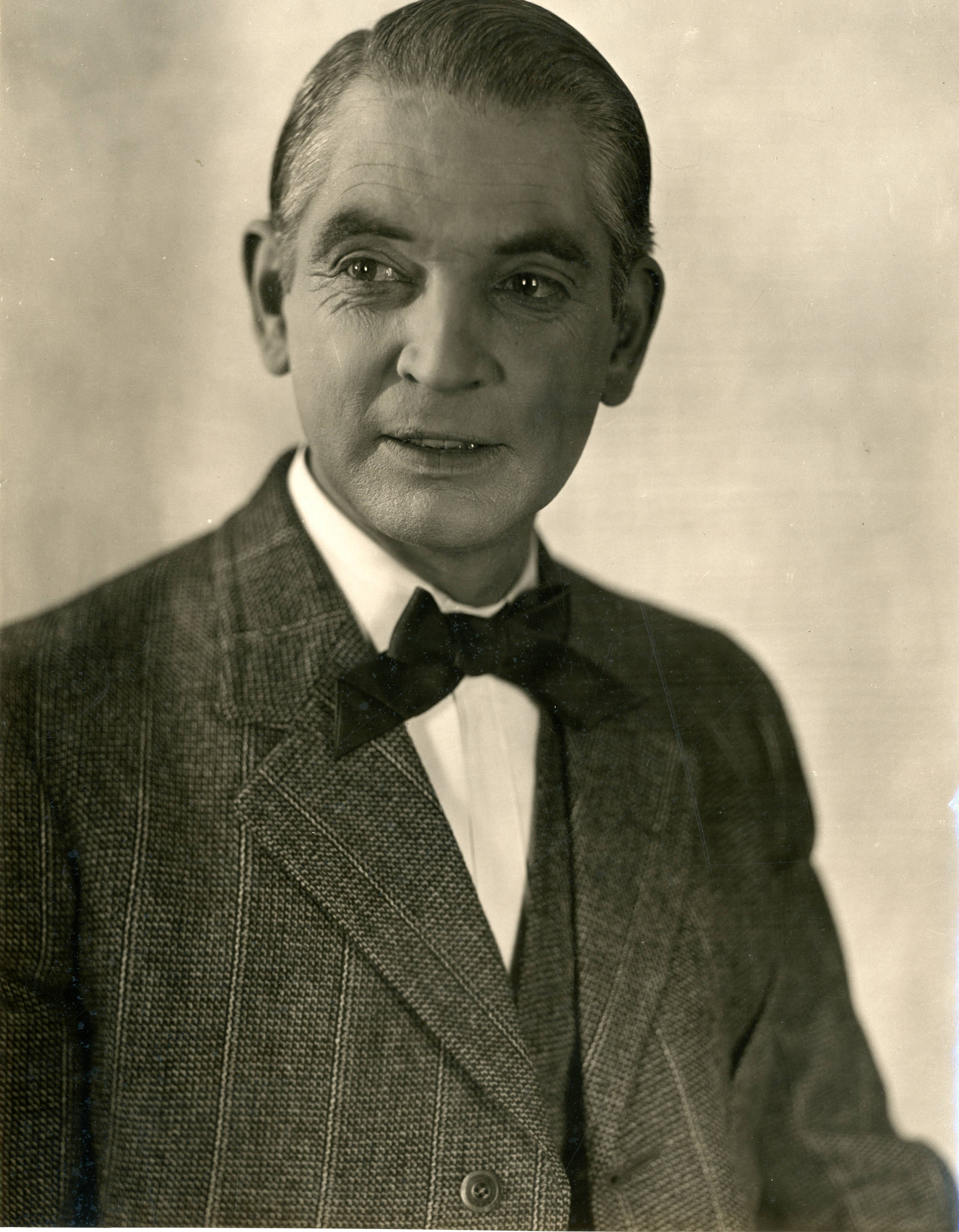
T. D. Crittenden
1921

== Sources ==
- Braff, R.E. (1999). The Universal Silents: A Filmography of the Universal Motion Picture Manufacturing Company, 1912-1929. McFarland. ISBN 978-0-7864-0287-8.
- Fleming, E.J. (2010). Wallace Reid: The Life and Death of a Hollywood Idol. McFarland. ISBN 978-0-7864-8266-5.
- Hirschhorn, Clive (1983). The Universal Story - The Complete History of the Studio and its 2,641 films. New York: Crown Publishing Group. pp. 22–23. ISBN 0-517-55001-6.
- Keil, C.; Stamp, S. (2004). American Cinema's Transitional Era: Audiences, Institutions, Practices. ACLS Humanities E-Book. University of California Press. ISBN 978-0-520-24027-8.
