= Doctor Neighbor =

1916 movie by Lloyd B. Carleton

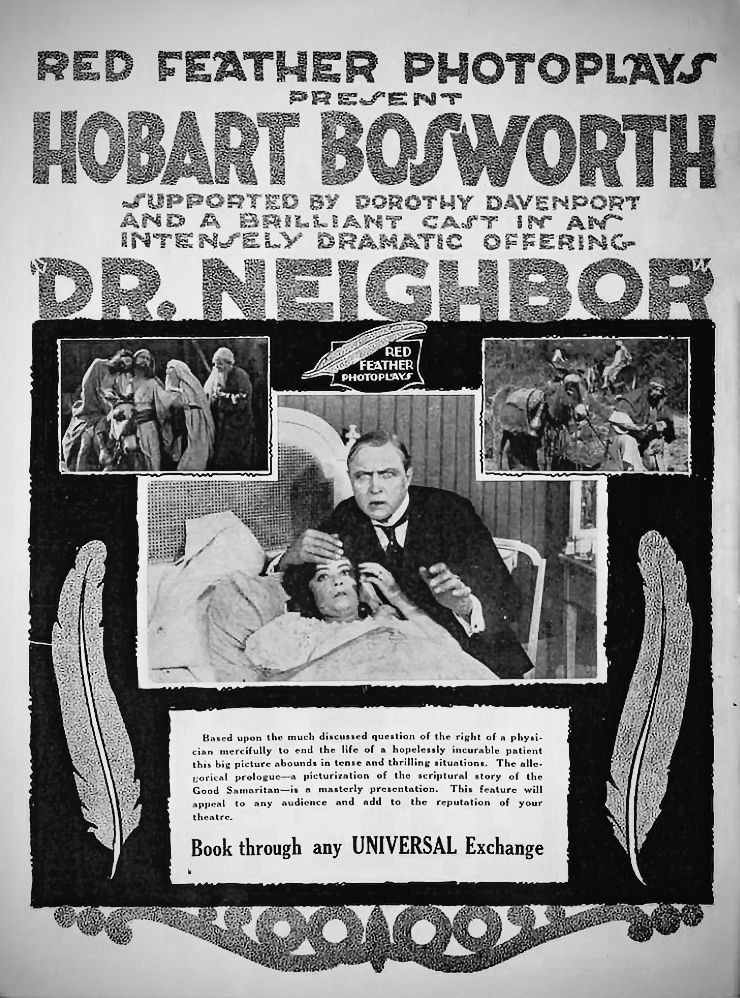
- Ad from The Moving Picture World
- Directed by: Lloyd B. Carleton
- Screenplay by: Agnes Hay
- Produced by: Lloyd B. Carleton, Universal Red Feather
- Starring: Hobart Bosworth; Emory Johnson; Dorothy Davenport
- Production company: Universal Film Manufacturing Company
- Distributed by: Universal
- Release date: May 1, 1916
- Running time: 50–75 minutes (5 reels)
- Country: USA
- Language: English intertitles

Doctor Neighbor is a 1916 American silent feature film black and white melodrama. The film was directed by Lloyd B. Carleton. It stars Hobart Bosworth and pairs Dorothy Davenport and Emory Johnson in leading roles.

The film explores the moral dilemma of whether a doctor should assist a patient in taking their own life when the patient is in great pain and facing imminent death.

The movie was released on May 1, 1916, by Universal.

== Plot ==
Dr. Joel Neighbor is a famous 42-year-old surgeon. He has built up vast medical knowledge through his years of practice and has dedicated his life to saving people. His ward, Hazel Rogers, is a beautiful 18-year-old heiress. She lives with her mother. Dr. Neighbor is the guardian of Hazel's fortune until she turns 21. In the event of her death, the doctor would become the heir to the estate.

Now that Hazel is coming of age, Dr. Neighbor asks her to become his wife. Hazel graciously declines his proposal. Hazel tells the doctor; she is in love with a district attorney named Hamilton Powers. Hazel has already promised to marry him. The doctor is against the marriage but accepts her reasons and bows out.

After Hazel marries Hamilton Powers, she realizes he is aloof and utterly committed to his law practice. Powers is respectful of Hazel but loves Hazel's close friend, a nurse named Christine Hall.

Powers asks Dr. Neighbor to transfer his trustee rights to Hazel's estate, but Dr. Neighbor refuses the request. After being rebuffed, Powers becomes even colder in his treatment of Hazel. After a few months of marriage, Powers leaves Hazel's magnificent home on Long Island to go to New York City. He claims he will have more opportunities to practice law in the big city.

Two guests arrive at Hazel's home to console her in her loneliness, Mrs. Preston and Morgan Keith. While the group is engaged in a friendly discussion, Powers shows up from New York City. Hazel and Hamilton have a bitter disagreement.

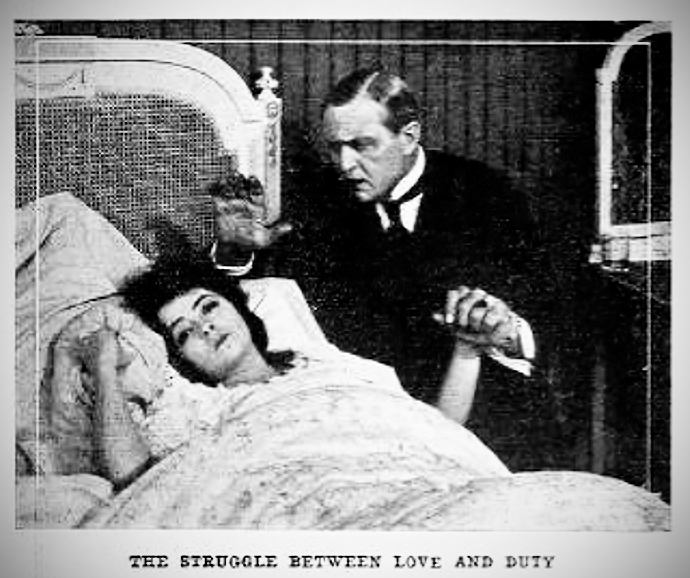
Dr. Neighbor attends to Hazel.

Hazel is distraught and goes for a drive in her car. While driving too fast, she has an accident that fractures her back and leaves her a helpless invalid. Dr. Neighbor attends to her, and Nurse Christine shows up to help care for her friend.

One night Hazel is in unbearable pain and cries out to Dr. Neighbor to put her out of her misery. Even though he still loves Hazel, the doctor must follow his oath. Christine, overwrought by her friend's agony and suffering, administers a fatal dose of morphine. After completing the deed, Christine forgets to dispose of the hypodermic needle and inadvertently leaves it on the table. Hazel will never awake. Dr. Neighbor enters the room, finds the needle, and puts it in his pocket.

Later, the authorities discover the needle that administered the fatal dose of morphine in the doctor's pocket. Since there is no love lost between Powers and Neighbor, Powers calls for an immediate inquiry. Hamilton points out that Hazel's death leaves Dr. Neighbor as the sole beneficiary of her fortune. The doctor keeps quiet during the entire criminal investigation. After they complete the inquiry, they charge Dr. Neighbor with murder. He must stand trial for homicide. During the trial, Christine becomes overwhelmed with remorse and confesses to the crime. After Christine's confession, they release Dr. Neighbor.

Hamilton Powers suffers from heart failure and needs a massive transfusion of blood to survive. Dr. Neighbor has the same blood type as Powers and donates his blood so that Powers may live.

Christine, freed from her prison term, pays a visit to Dr. Neighbor. She discovers him dead from exhaustion and loss of blood.

== Cast ==
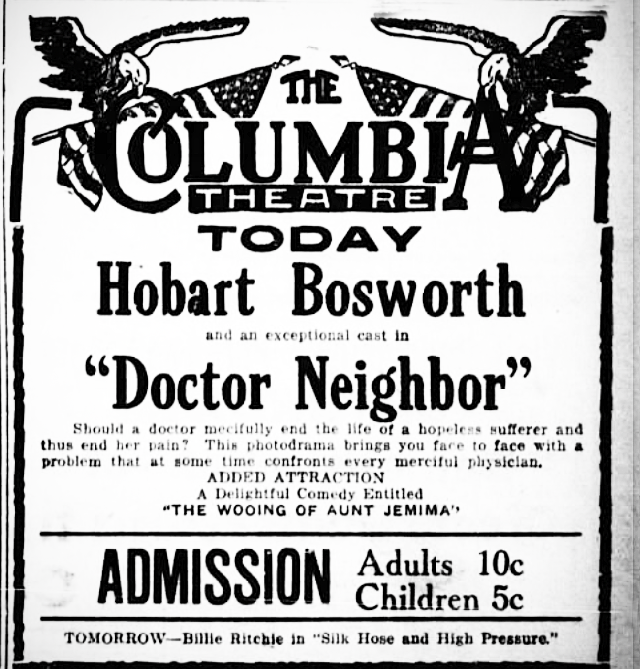
Actor	Role
Hobart Bosworth	Dr. Joel Neighbor
Dorothy Davenport	Hazel Rogers
Gretchen Lederer	Christine Hall
Emory Johnson	Hamilton Powers
Charles H. Hickman	Morgan Keith
Adele Farrington	Mrs. Preston
Margaret Whistler	Mrs. Albert Rogers

== Production ==
=== Pre-production ===
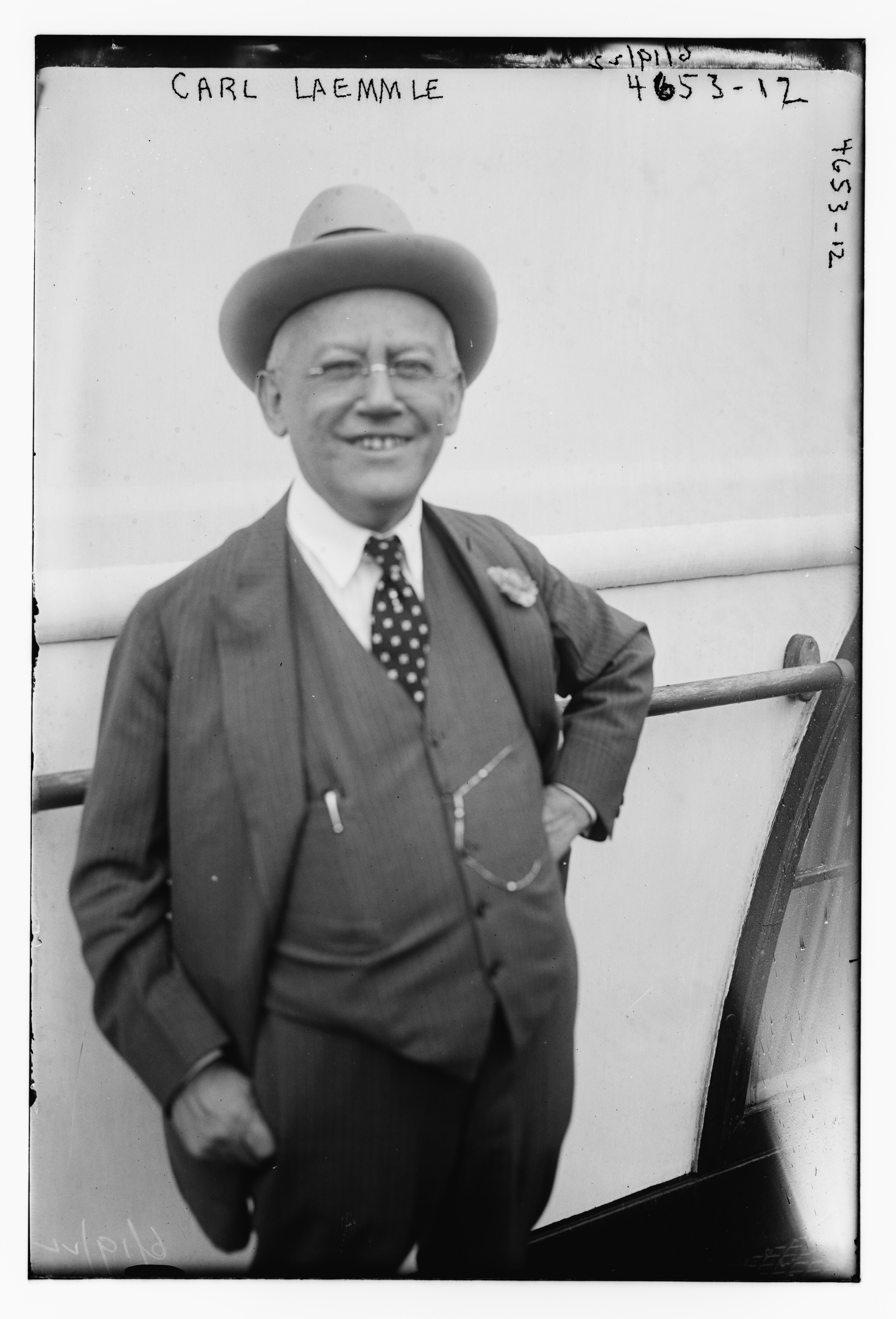
Carl Laemmle in 1918

Universal Logo 1915

In the book, "American Cinema's Transitional Era," the authors point out, The years between 1908 and 1917 witnessed what may have been the most significant transformation in American film history. During this "transitional era", widespread changes affected film form and film genres, filmmaking practices and industry structure, exhibition sites, and audience demographics. One aspect of this transition was the longer duration of films. Feature films (Note: A "feature film" or "feature-length film" is a narrative film (motion picture or "movie") with a running time long enough to be considered the principal or sole presentation in a commercial entertainment program. A film can be distributed as a feature film if it equals or exceeds a specified minimum running time and satisfies other defined criteria. The minimum time depends on the governing agency. The American Film Institute and the British Film Institute require films to have a minimum running time of forty minutes or longer. Other film agencies, e.g.,Screen Actors Guild, require a film's running time to be 60 minutes or greater. Currently, most feature films are between 70 and 210 minutes long.) were slowly becoming the standard fare for Hollywood producers. Before 1913, you could count the yearly features on two hands. Between 1915 and 1916, the number of feature movies rose 2 1/2 times or from 342 films to 835. There was a recurring claim that Carl Laemmle was the longest-running studio chief resisting the production of feature films. Universal was not ready to downsize its short film business because short films were cheaper, faster, and more profitable to produce than feature films. (Note: " Short Film" - There are no defined parameters for a Short film except for one immutable rule -the film's maximum running time. The Academy of Motion Picture Arts and Sciences defines a short film as "an original motion picture that has a running time of 40 minutes or less, including all credits".)

Laemmle would continue to buck this trend while slowly increasing his output of features. In 1914, Laemmle published an essay titled - Doom of long Features Predicted. In 1916, Laemmle ran an advertisement extolling Bluebird films while adding the following vocabulary on the top of the ad. (Note: The moving picture business is here to stay. That you must admit, despite carping critics and blundering sore-heads, true, some exhibitors have found business so good lately — but if you get down to facts when you look for a reason why, it's a 100 to 1 shot that they are, and for some time have been, dallying with a feature program. Some of these wise ones will tell you that business has picked up since they went into features, — BUT — ask them whether they are talking NET or GROSS. They will find they have an immediate appointment and terminate your queries unceremoniously. Funny how we like to kid ourselves, isn't it? The man who is packing 'em in and losing money on features is envied by his competitor, who is laying by a bit every day, and has a good steady, dependable patronage but admits to a few vacant seats at some performances. When this chap wakes up, he will realize that he has a gold mine and that good advertising will make it produce to capacity. The moral is that if you can tie up to the Universal Program, DO IT. If you can't NOW, watch your first chance. Let the people know what you have, and let the feature man go on to ruin if he wants to. You should worry! Motion Picture News - May 6, 1916) Carl Laemmle released 91 feature-length films in 1916, as stated in Clive Hirschhorn's book, The Universal Story.

==== Casting ====
- Hobart Van Zandt Bosworth (1867–1943) was 48 years old when he starred in this movie as Dr. Joel Neighbor. Bosworth was a well-known Universal actor. After Universal signed a 21-year-old Emory Johnson, Hobart thought he saw a potential mega-career for the 21-year-old. Hobart decided to mentor the young actor. After finishing The Yaqui released March 1916, they immediately made another feature-length Western - Two Men of Sandy Bar released in April. Later in the year, Emory would make two more films with Bosworth. They would continue collaborating in other films in the coming years. In Bosworth's long cinematic career, he appeared in nearly 300 films.
- Dorothy Davenport (1895–1977) was an established star for Universal when the 21 year-old actress played Hazel Rogers. She had acted in hundreds of movies by the time she starred in this film. The majority of these films were 2-reel shorts, as was the norm in Hollywood's teen years. She had been making movies since 1910. She started dating Wally Reid when she was barely 16, and he was 20. They married in 1913. After her husband died in 1923, she used the name "Mrs. Wallace Reid" in the credits for any project she took part in. Besides being an actress, she would eventually become a film director, producer, and writer.
- Emory Johnson (1894–1960) was 22 years old when he acted in this movie as Hamilton Powers. In January 1916, Emory signed a contract with Universal Film Manufacturing Company. Carl Laemmle of Universal Film Manufacturing Company thought he saw great potential in Johnson, so he chooses him to be Universal's new leading man. Laemmle's hope was Johnson would become another Wallace Reed. A major part of his plan was to create a movie couple that would sizzle on the silver screen. Laemmle thought Dorothy Davenport and Emory Johnson could create the chemistry he sought. Johnson and Davenport would complete 13 films together. They started with the successful feature production of this movie in May 1916 and ended with The Devil's Bondwoman in November 1916. After completing the last movie, Laemmle thought Johnson did not have the screen presence he wanted. He decided not to renew his contract. Johnson would make 17 movies in 1916, including 6 shorts and 11 feature-length Dramas. 1916 would become the second-highest movie output of his entire acting career. Emory acted in 25 films for Universal, mostly dramas with a sprinkling of comedies and westerns.
- Gretchen Lederer (1891–1955) was 24 years old when she portrayed Christine Hall. The German actress got her first start in 1912 with Carl Laemmle of Universal Film Manufacturing Company. At the time of this film, she was still a Universal contract actress. She would unite with Emory Johnson in the 1916 productions of A Yoke of Gold and The Morals of Hilda.
- Adele Farrington (Mrs. Hobart Bosworth) (c. 1867-1936) was 49 years old when she portrayed Mrs. Preston. She was also a Universal contract player appearing in 74 films between 1914 and 1926. Although she got her start in movies when she was 47-years-old (1914), Universal cast her mostly in character leads. Many of her roles were acting alongside her husband, Hobart Bosworth, who married in 1909 and divorced in 1920. In addition to her roles as an actress, she was also a music composer and writer.
- Margaret Whistler (1888–1939) was 27 years old when she played the role of Mrs. Albert Rogers. Before entering the film business, she had appeared in vaudeville, stock, and circuses, where she was a lion and tiger trainer. She entered the movie industry in 1911 with Lubin and then signed a contract with Universal in 1913. Whistler usually played heavies and character leads. Besides being a talented actress, Whistler is an authority on dress and a very successful designer.

==== Director ====
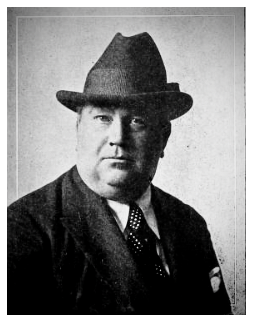
Director Lloyd B. Carleton

Lloyd B. Carleton (c. 1872–1933) started working for Carl Laemmle in the Fall of 1915. Carleton arrived with impeccable credentials, having directed some 60 films for the likes of Thanhouser, Lubin, Fox, and Selig. Between March and December 1916, 44-year-old Lloyd Carleton directed 16 movies for Universal, starting with The Yaqui and ending with The Morals of Hilda. Emory Johnson acted in all 16 of these films. Of Carleton's total 1916 output, 11 were feature films, and the rest were two-reel shorts. After Emory Johnson signed his Universal contract in early 1916, Carl Laemmle, the owner of Universal Pictures, thought he had found a new leading man. Laemmle was looking for a male lead like Wallace Reid. He also wanted to develop a cinematic pair that would captivate audiences.

Johnson became Laemmle's choice for his new leading man. Laemmle chose Dorothy Davenport to spark screen chemistry with Johnson. She was a Universal contract player who was Wallace Reid's wife. Universal's top director, Lloyd B. Carleton, was tasked by Laemmle to direct all of this pair's films.

The collaboration of Johnson and Davenport resulted in 13 films, beginning with the release of Doctor Neighbor in May 1916. The last film in the series was The Devil's Bondwoman, released in November 1916. The majority of the movies were feature films. All the films featured Johnson and Davenport as the main stars.

Davenport became pregnant in October 1916, and her film output dropped sharply in early 1917. In the end, Laemmle felt Johnson was not talented nor charismatic enough. He would not be Universal's version of Wally Reid. Laemmle felt that the films needed more screen chemistry, even if they made money. In June 1918, Universal failed to renew the contract of Emory Johnson.

The table below lists the 13 films Johnson and Davenport collaborated on.

◆ Films starring Emory Johnson and Dorothy Davenport in 1916 ◆
Title	Released	Director	Davenport role	Johnson role	Type	Time	LOC	Brand	Notes
Doctor Neighbor	1 May	Carleton	Hazel Rogers	Hamilton Powers	Drama	Feature	lost	Red Feather	
Her Husband's Faith	11 May	Carleton	Mabel Otto	Richard Otto	Drama	Short	lost	Universal	
Heartaches	18 May	Carleton	Virginia Payne	S Jackson Hunt	Drama	Short	lost	Universal	
Two Mothers	1 Jun	Carleton	Violetta Andree	2nd Husband	Drama	Short	lost	Universal	
Her Soul's Song	15 Jun	Carleton	Mary Salsbury	Paul Chandos	Drama	Short	lost	Universal	
The Way of the World	3 Jul	Carleton	Beatrice Farley	Walter Croyden	Drama	Feature	lost	Red Feather	
No. 16 Martin Street	13 Jul	Carleton	Cleo	Jacques Fournier	Drama	Short	lost	Universal	
A Yoke of Gold	14 Aug	Carleton	Carmen	Jose Garcia	Drama	Feature	lost	Red Feather	
The Unattainable	4 Sep	Carleton	Bessie Gale	Robert Goodman	Drama	Feature	1 of 5 reels	Bluebird	
Black Friday	18 Sep	Carleton	Elionor Rossitor	Charles Dalton	Drama	Feature	lost	Red Feather	
The Human Gamble	8 Oct	Carleton	Flavia Hill	Charles Hill	Drama	Short	lost	Universal	
Barriers of Society	10 Oct	Carleton	Martha Gorham	Westie Phillips	Drama	Feature	1 of 5 reels	Red Feather	
The Devil's Bondwoman	11 Nov	Carleton	Beverly Hope	Mason Van Horton	Drama	Feature	lost	Red Feather	

==== Screenplay ====
We have very limited information about Agnes Hay, the screen and story writer for this film. Agnes May is credited as the screenwriter in the Library of Congress Copyright records. The Library of Congress entry was misprinted because all subsequent publications credit Ages Hay as the story creator.

According to the June 10, 1916 edition of the Monterey Daily Cypress and Monterey American, Agnes Hay "wrote the story at Hobart Bosworth's suggestion." The April 22, 1916 issue of the Motion Picture News states: "To drive home her point, Author Agnes Hay has seen occasion to call for the picturization of a number of scenes taken around the bed of one Hazel Rogers, who with her spine twisted and fractured by an automobile accident, lies praying her attendants to deprive her of her life."

Agnes Hay is mentioned again in 1923. An item in the March 3, 1923 issue of The Moving Picture World reads: "Work on 'The Call of the Roaring Falls' has been started by the Capital City Players at that company's studios, Washington, D. C. The story was written for this independent organization by Miss Agnes Hay, whose scripts have been produced by Universal and other large organizations."

Authoritative sources list this film as her only credit.

==== Themes ====
This film examines the topic of euthanasia and mercy killing. It highlighted the ethical predicament doctors meet when given these options:

- Support a terminally ill patient in ending their life to alleviate their unmanageable pain.
- Help the patient when they make the decision to keep living, even in the face of inevitable suffering and pain.

Also, is it a breach of the Hippocratic Oath to aid a patient in ending their incurable suffering by assisting in their early death?

=== Filming ===
On March 15, 1915, Laemmle opened the world's largest motion picture production facility, Universal City Studios. Since this film required no location shooting, it was filmed in its entirety at the new studio complex. The photoplay was filmed sometime between January and early February 1916.

==== Working title ====
When films enter production, they need the means to reference the project. A Working title is assigned to the project. A Working Title can also be named an Alternate title. In many cases, a working title will become the release title.
Working titles are used primarily for two reasons:

- An official title for the project has not been determined
- A non-descript title to mask the real reason for making the movie.

This film had several alternate titles including:

- Doctor Samson
- Dr. Neighbor
- A Law for the Detective
- Dr. Samson

=== Post production ===
The theatrical release of this film totaled five reels or 4,921 feet of film. As is often the case, the listed time for this feature-length movie varies. The average time per 1,000-foot 35mm reel varied between ten and fifteen minutes per reel at the time. Thus, the total time for this movie is computed between fifty and seventy-five minutes.

== Release and reception ==
=== Official release ===
The copyright was filed with U.S. Copyright Office on April 7, 1916. and entered into the record as shown: (Note: The copyright was filed with U.S. Copyright Office and entered into the record as shown. DOCTOR NEIGHBOR Red Feather, 1916. 5 reels. Credits: Agnes May; producer, L.B. Carleton. © Universal Film Mfg. Co., Inc.; 7Apr16; LP8040) In 1916, "Red Feather" movies were always released on Mondays. This film was officially released on Monday, May 1, 1916.

=== Advertising ===
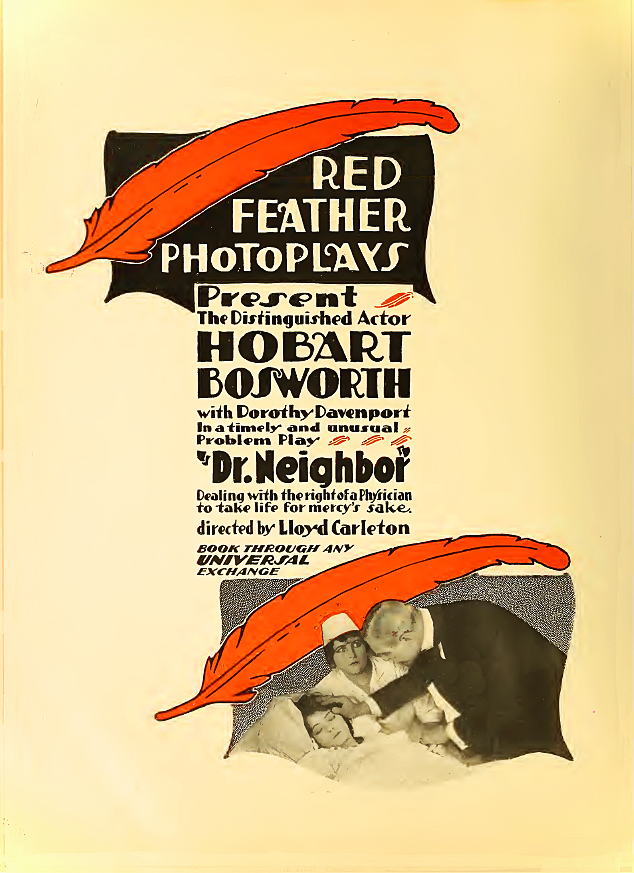
Motion Picture News Movie Ad

In 1916, Universal became the first Hollywood studio to classify feature films based on production cost. One of the reasons behind this move was that the "Big Five" film studios owned their own movie houses, enabling them to have guaranteed outlets for their entertainment products. Unlike the majors, Universal did not own any theaters or theater chains. Branding all Universal-produced feature films would give theater owners another tool to judge the films they were about to lease and help fans decide which movies they wanted to see. (Note: Universal formed a three-tier branding system for their feature films based on the size of their budget and status. In the book "The Universal Story," the author Clive Hirschhorn describes the feature movie branding as: Red Feather Photoplays – low-budget feature films; Bluebird Photoplays – mainstream feature release and more ambitious productions; Jewel – prestige motion pictures featuring high budgets using prominent actors; In 1917, the Butterfly line, a grade between Red Feather and Bluebird, was introduced. During the following two years, half of Universal's feature film output was in the Red Feather and Butterfly categories. However, this was during a time when stars increasingly took the spotlight in advertising. The branding tags seemly ignored that the ticket-buying audience attended movies to see their favorite stars, not the vehicle allowing them to perform.)

In 1916, Universal produced 91 branded feature films, consisting of 44 Bluebirds and 47 Red Feather productions. The branding system had a brief existence and, by 1920, had faded away.

=== Reviews ===
The critics generally liked this film and its sensitive subject matter.

In the May 6, 1916, issue of the New York Clipper, Len wrote:

"Hobart Bosworth is an excellent screen actor ... In "Dr. Neighbor," he has ample scope for the display of his talents ... Good Production, competent action. All in all, good picture."

In the April 22, 1916 issue of the Motion Picture News, Peter Milne wrote:

"Hobart Bosworth makes a powerful figure of the doctor, and Dorothy Davenport is the center of great sympathy as the ruined girl. Gretchen Lederer is the nurse, Emory Johnson the husband, while Adele Farrington and Margaret Whistler have other prominent parts which they handled exceedingly well. Lloyd B. Carleton directed. His work is praiseworthy, for he has handled an extremely delicate subject in the least offensive manner possible."

In the April 22, 1916 issue of The Moving Picture World, Robert C. McElravy wrote:

"This subject takes up in pictorial form the mooted question as to whether a doctor should under any circumstances take the life of a patient to save unnecessary suffering when death is but a matter of time or the patient doomed to a shattered mentality in case of recovery. Dealing as it does with the problem of human suffering, it contains many scenes that are far from cheerful, and yet the theme is presented in a manner that avoids skillfully the merely sordid or depressing. This is very interesting as a study of medical ethics. The plot moves a little slowly at first, and the minor characters are rather shadowy for the reason that they have but little to do."

== Preservation status ==
Many silent-era films did not survive for reasons as explained on this Wikipedia page. (Note: Film is history. With every foot of film lost, we lose a link to our culture, the world around us, each other, and ourselves. – Martin Scorsese, filmmaker, director NFPF Board A report by Library of Congress film historian and archivist David Pierce estimates that: around 75% of original silent-era films have perished; 14% of the 10,919 silent films released by major studios exist in their original 35 mm or other formats; 11% survive only in full-length foreign versions or film formats of lesser image quality.)

According to the Library of Congress, all known copies of this film are lost.

== Gallery ==
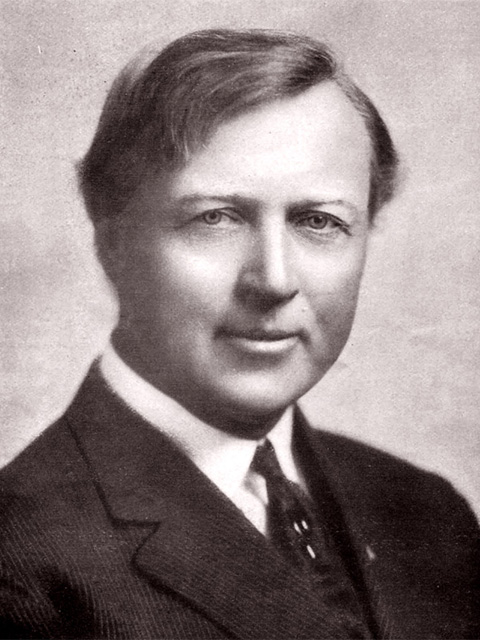
Hobart Bosworth in 1916

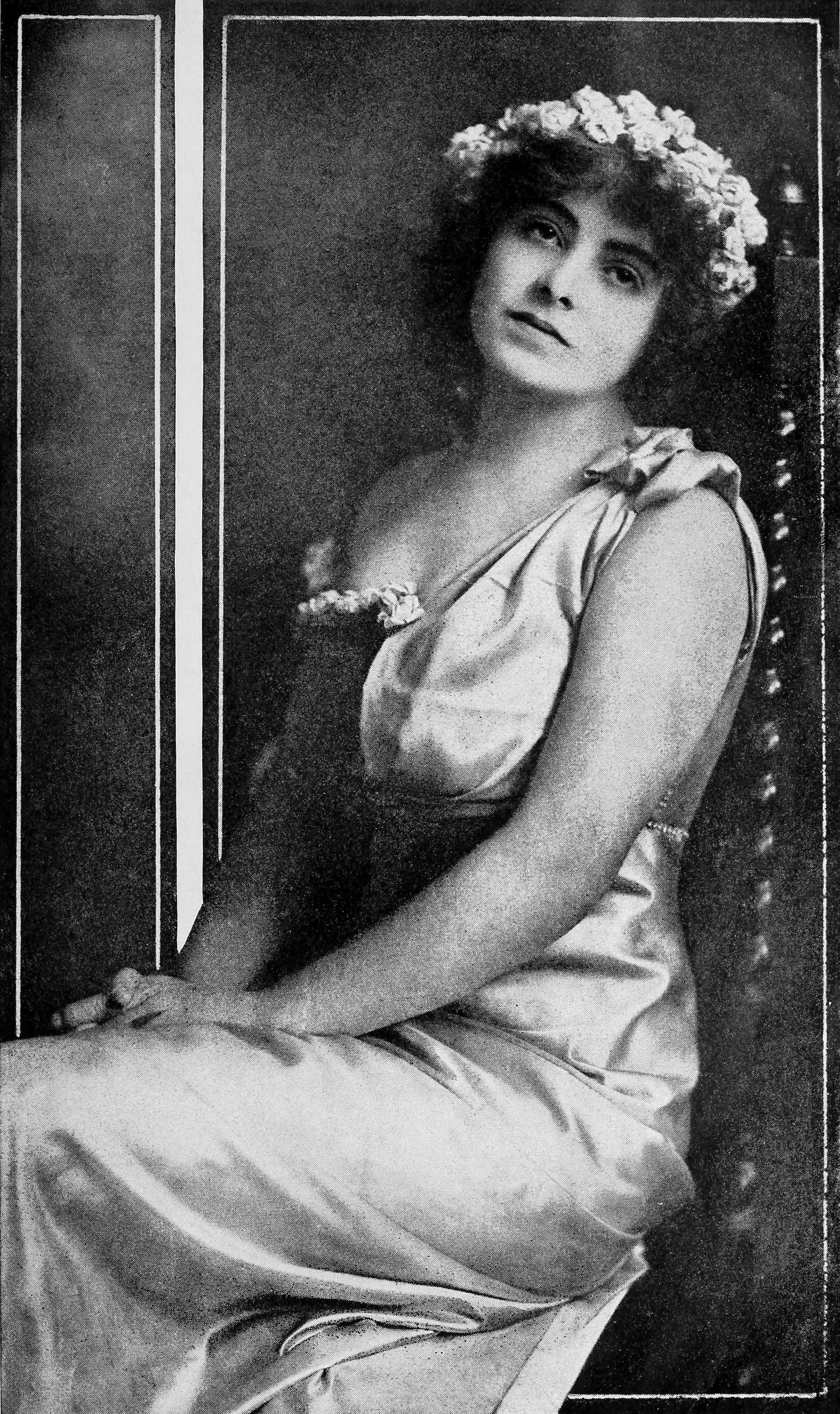
Dorothy Davenport in 1916

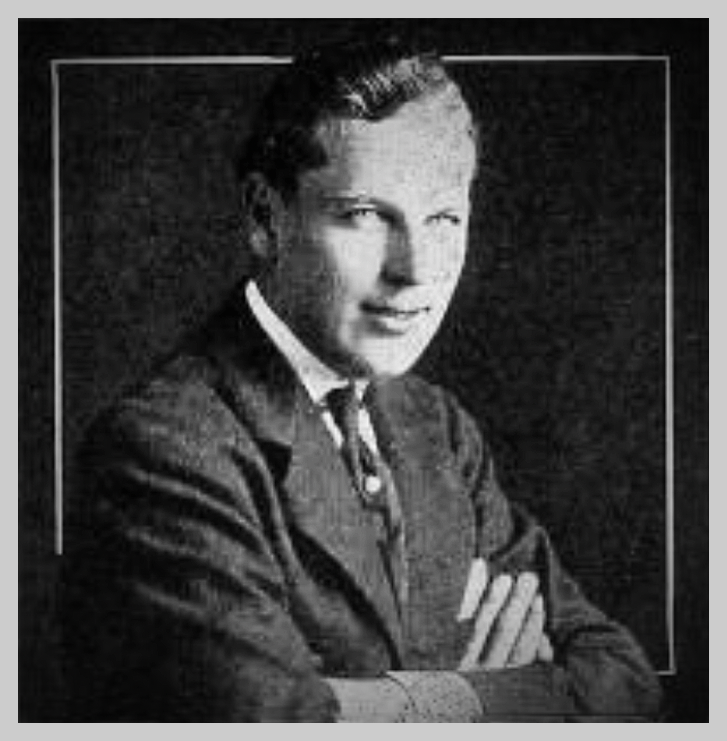
Emory Johnson in 1916

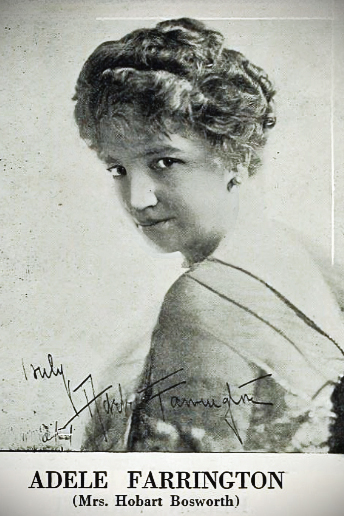
Adele Farrington in 1916

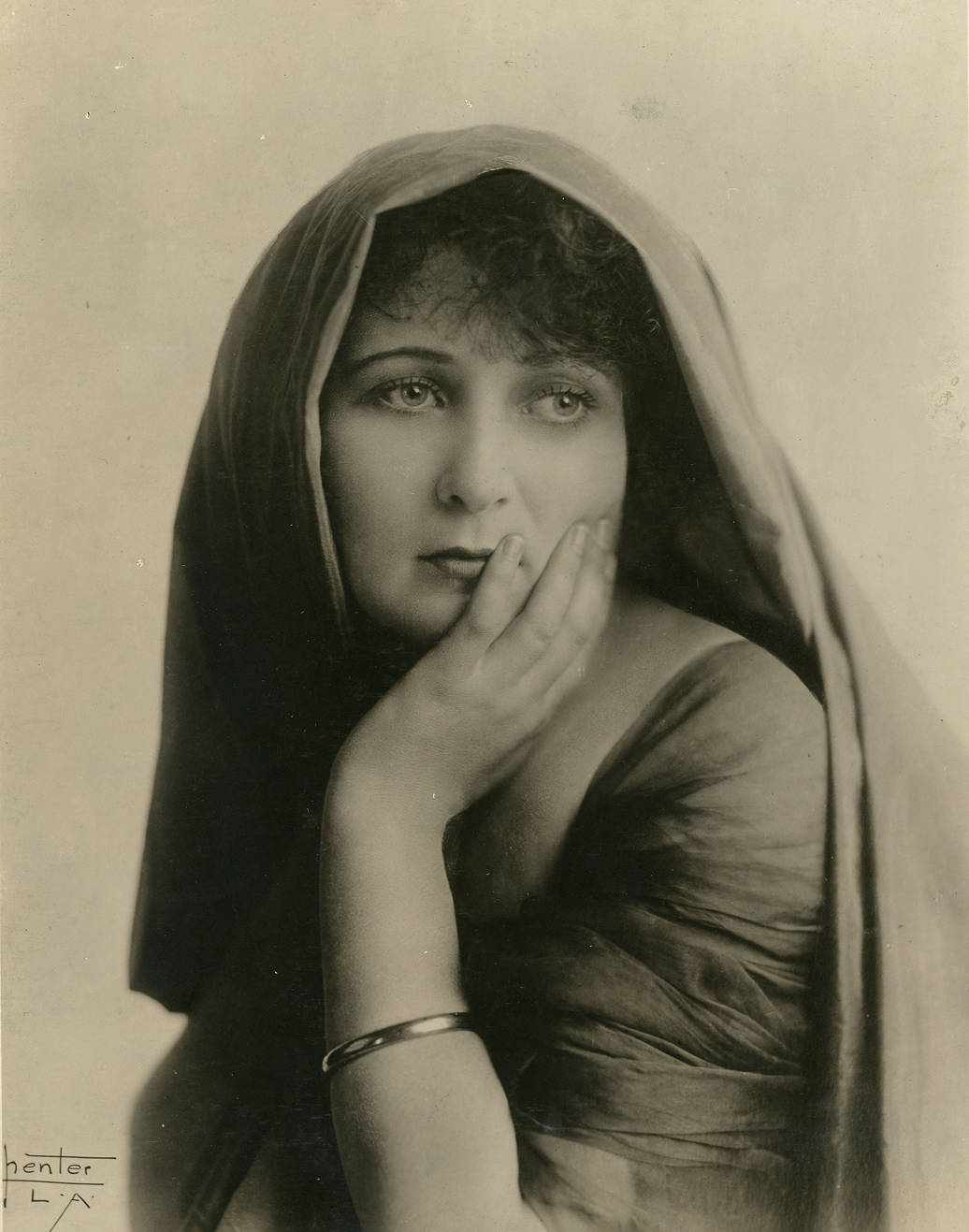
Gretchen Lederer in 1924

== Sources ==
- Braff, R.E. (1999). The Universal Silents: A Filmography of the Universal Motion Picture Manufacturing Company, 1912-1929. McFarland. ISBN 978-0-7864-0287-8.
- Fleming, E.J. (2010). Wallace Reid: The Life and Death of a Hollywood Idol. McFarland. ISBN 978-0-7864-8266-5.
- Hirschhorn, Clive (1983). The Universal Story - The Complete History of the Studio and its 2,641 films. New York: Crown Publishing Group. pp. 22–23. ISBN 0-517-55001-6.
- Keil, C.; Stamp, S. (2004). American Cinema's Transitional Era: Audiences, Institutions, Practices. ACLS Humanities E-Book. University of California Press. ISBN 978-0-520-24027-8.
