= Her Soul's Song =

1916 movie by Lloyd B. Carleton

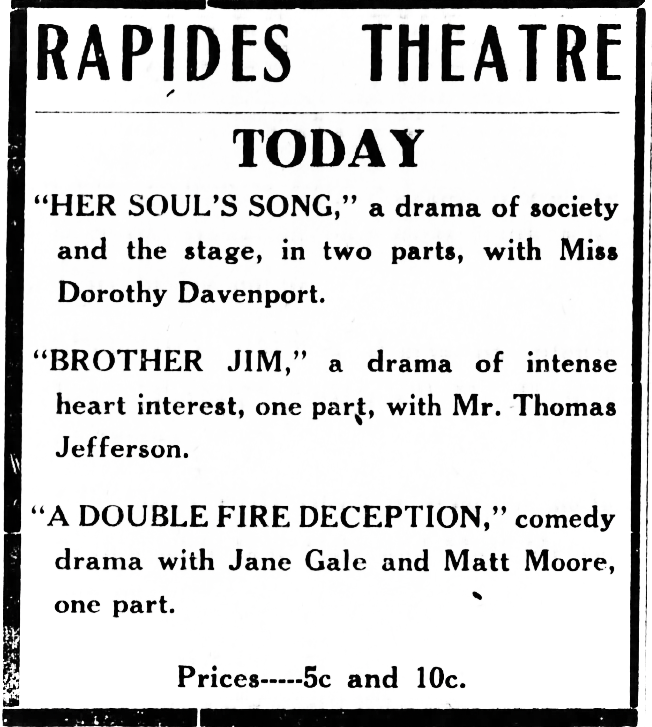
- Newspaper Movie Ad
- Directed by: Lloyd B. Carleton
- Written by: Betty Schade
- Screenplay by: Calder Johnstone
- Produced by: Lloyd B. Carleton
- Starring: Dorothy Davenport; Emory Johnson
- Production company: Universal
- Distributed by: Universal
- Release date: June 15, 1916
- Running time: 15–24 minutes (2 reels)
- Country: United States
- Language: Silent (English intertitles)

Her Soul's Song is a 1916 American silent short film directed by Lloyd B. Carleton. The film is based on a story by Betty Schade. Calder Johnstone developed the screenplay. This drama's features Dorothy Davenport and Emory Johnson.

The story involves an opera singer who marries, then loses her voice after the couple's baby is born. The event causes her to resent the newborn, and she abandons both her husband and baby. Later she returns when the child is ill. The baby makes a miraculous recovery, and the singer regains her voice and her happiness.

The film was released on June 15, 1916, by Universal.

== Plot ==
Mary Salsbury and Paul Chandos live in the small city. Paul is trying to become a prosperous business owner, and Mary wants to become a professional singer. Mary loves Paul, and the two seem destined to wed. Finally, Paul asks Mary to be his wife. Faced with a significant life decision, Mary tells Paul she cannot marry until she finds if her voice can make her a star. She declines Paul's proposal and moves to the big city to have her voice professionally developed.

Five years past, Paul's businesses have flourished, and he has become highly successful. Along with friends, Paul attends a concert by a famous singer. He discovers the singer is no other than Mary, now an established star named Valeria Salsbury. They reconnect and start seeing each other. Their many dates rekindle Paul's love for Valeria, and he proposes again. She consents this time with one huge caveat. Anytime Valeria wishes to return to the stage, he must support her. Paul agrees to the stipulation, and they married.

One year later, Valeria gives birth to a baby girl. Though delighted, she finds out the birth has caused her to lose her singing voice. She makes a doctor's appointment, but after a close examination, the physician tells her she will never sing again. As the days pass, she becomes sullen, blaming the child for losing her singing voice.

Valeria discovers there is a prominent doctor in Europe treating conditions like hers. With melancholia overwhelming her life, she tells Paul she needs to go to Europe to see this famous doctor. Paul tells her she is wasting time away from the family since there is no treatment for her condition. They have a heated exchange, and she leaves for Europe, leaving behind the baby in Paul's care.

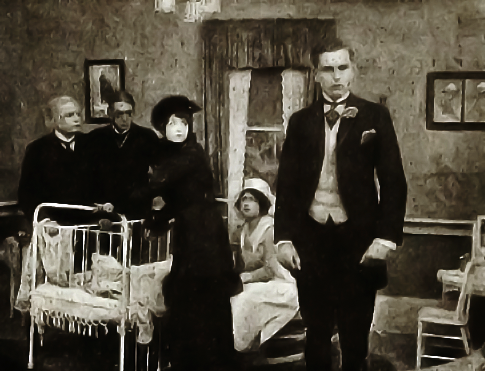
The baby is ill

After arriving in Europe, she visits the clinic. The physicians advise her there is no cure for her condition. They suggest she should focus on caring for her husband and baby. Despondent, she heads back to her hotel room. She has a dream after she falls asleep; her baby is sick and needs her care. Then she has an epiphany. It occurs to her; she has given up everything for a medical issue that has no cure. She rushes back to the states to be with her baby.

When she returns, she finds her baby is seriously ill. Since their last roe, Paul is hesitant to let her see the baby. In fact, he blames her for the child's illness since the baby lacked a mother's care. He relents and allows her to see her daughter while a physician is present. She asks the doctor if there is any hope for the baby's recovery. The doctor tells her there is none. She must hold her child close and say her last goodbyes. She becomes hysterical and screams; nobody will take her child. The baby cries, and to soothe the infant, she hums a lullaby.

Suddenly it occurs to her—how is she able to hum a lullaby? Has her voice returned? It's a miracle her voice has returned. She hugs her baby even closer. Paul glances at her sadly, understanding there is nothing they can do for the poor baby. She sings to the baby all night long. The next morning, the doctor arrives, fully expecting the worst but discovering the baby is much better. After an examination, the doctor declares the baby has made a miraculous recovery and should recover fully. He has no explanation for the turnabout, except a mother's devotion can work wonders. Paul reconciles with Mary, and they live happily ever after.

== Cast ==
Actor	Role
Dorothy Davenport	Mary Salsbury
Emory Johnson	Paul Chandos
Virginia Southern	The Nurse
Virginia Kerrigan	The Baby

== Production ==
=== Pre production ===
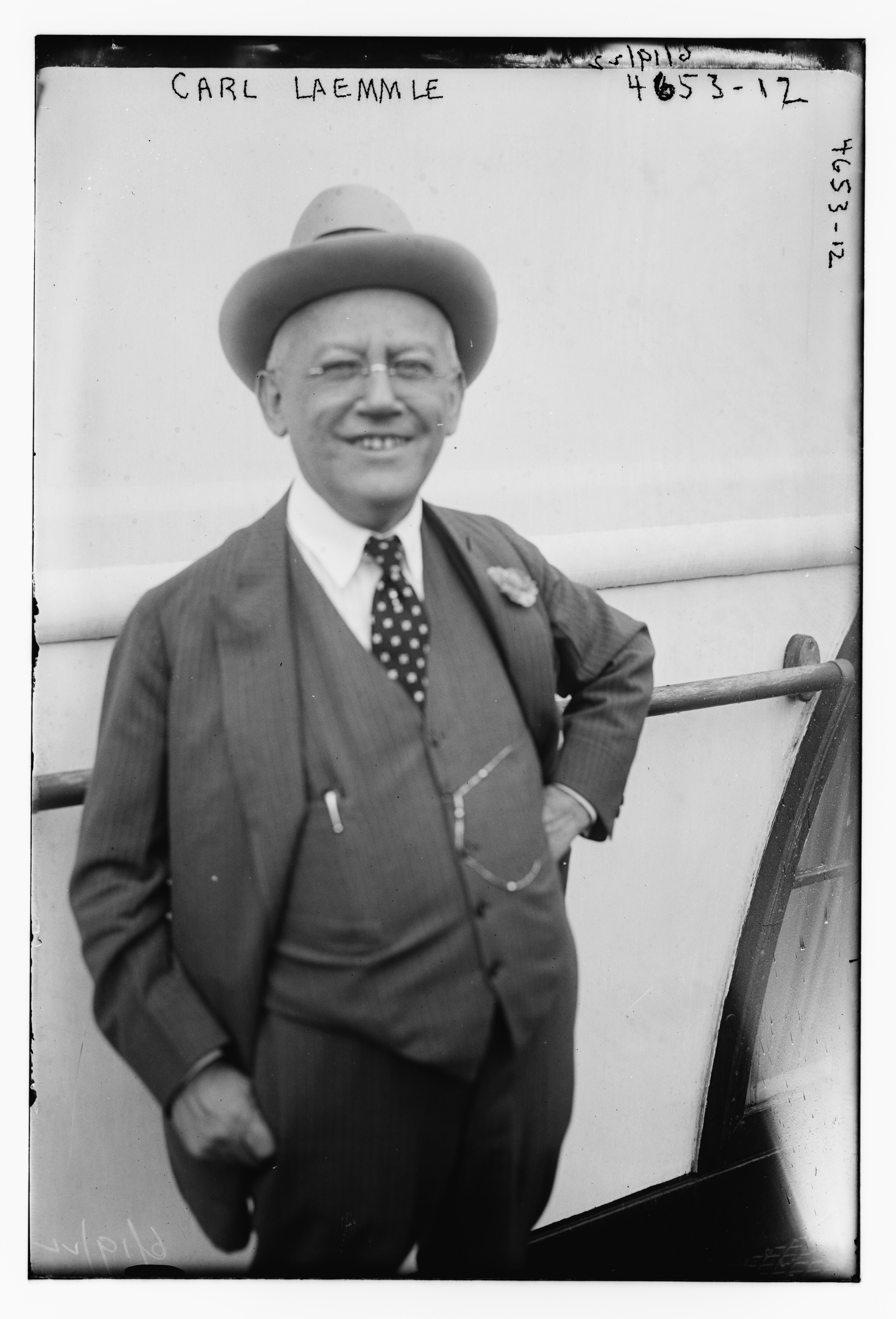
Carl Laemmle in 1918

Universal Logo 1915

In the book, "American Cinema's Transitional Era," the authors point out, The years between 1908 and 1917 witnessed what may have been the most significant transformation in American film history. During this "transitional era," widespread changes affected film form and film genres, filmmaking practices and industry structure, exhibition sites, and audience demographics. One aspect of this transition was the longer duration of films. Feature films (Note: A "feature film" or "feature-length film" is a narrative film (motion picture or "movie") with a running time long enough to be considered the principal or sole presentation in a commercial entertainment program. A film can be distributed as a feature film if it equals or exceeds a specified minimum running time and satisfies other defined criteria. The minimum time depends on the governing agency. The American Film Institute and the British Film Institute require films to have a minimum running time of forty minutes or longer. Other film agencies, e.g.,Screen Actors Guild, require a film's running time to be 60 minutes or greater. Currently, most feature films are between 70 and 210 minutes long.) were slowly becoming the standard fare for Hollywood producers. Before 1913, you could count the yearly features on two hands. Between 1915 and 1916, the number of feature movies rose 2 ½ times or from 342 films to 835. There was a recurring claim that Carl Laemmle was the longest-running studio chief resisting the production of feature films. Universal was not ready to downsize its short film business because short films were cheaper, faster, and more profitable to produce than feature films. (Note: " Short Film" - There are no defined parameters for a Short film except for one immutable rule -the film's maximum running time. The Academy of Motion Picture Arts and Sciences defines a short film as "an original motion picture that has a running time of 40 minutes or less, including all credits".)

Laemmle would continue to buck this trend while slowly increasing his output of features. In 1914, Laemmle published an essay titled - Doom of long Features Predicted. In 1915, Laemmle ran an advertisement extolling Bluebird films while adding the following vocabulary on the top of the ad. (Note: The moving picture business is here to stay. That you must admit, despite carping critics and blundering sore-heads, true, some exhibitors have found business so good lately — but if you get down to facts when you look for a reason why, it's a 100 to 1 shot that they are, and for some time have been, dallying with a feature program. Some of these wise ones will tell you that business has picked up since they went into features, — BUT — ask them whether they are talking NET or GROSS. They will find they have an immediate appointment and terminate your queries unceremoniously. Funny how we like to kid ourselves, isn't it? The man who is packing 'em in and losing money on features is envied by his competitor, who is laying by a bit every day, and has a good steady, dependable patronage but admits to a few vacant seats at some performances. When this chap wakes up, he will realize that he has a gold mine and that good advertising will make it produce to capacity. The moral is that if you can tie up to the Universal Program, DO IT. If you can't NOW, watch your first chance. Let the people know what you have, and let the feature man go on to ruin if he wants to. You should worry! Motion Picture News - May 6, 1916) Carl Laemmle released 100 feature-length films in 1916, as stated in Clive Hirschhorn's book, The Universal Story.

==== Casting ====
- Dorothy Davenport (1895–1977) was an established star for Universal when the 21 year-old actress played the Mary Salsbury. She had acted in hundreds of movies by the time she starred in this film. The majority of these films were 2-reel shorts, as was the norm in Hollywood's teen years. She had been making movies since 1910. She started dating Wally Reid when she was barely 16, and he was 20. They married in 1913. After her husband died in 1923, she used the name "Mrs. Wallace Reid" in the credits for any project she took part in. Besides being an actress, she would eventually become a film director, producer, and writer.
- Emory Johnson (1894–1960) was 22 years old when he acted in this movie as Paul Chandos. In January 1916, Emory signed a contract with Universal Film Manufacturing Company. Carl Laemmle of Universal Film Manufacturing Company thought he saw great potential in Johnson, so he chooses him to be Universal's new leading man. Laemmle's hope was Johnson would become another Wallace Reed. A major part of his plan was to create a movie couple that would sizzle on the silver screen. Laemmle thought Dorothy Davenport and Emory Johnson could create the chemistry he sought. Johnson and Davenport would complete 13 films together. They started with the successful feature production of Doctor Neighbor in May 1916 and ended with The Devil's Bondwoman in November 1916. After completing the last movie, Laemmle thought Johnson did not have the screen presence he wanted. He decided not to renew his contract.Johnson would make 17 movies in 1916, including 6 shorts and 11 feature-length Dramas. 1916 would become the second-highest movie output of his entire acting career. Emory acted in 25 films for Universal, mostly dramas with a sprinkling of comedies and westerns.
- Virginia Kerrigan, otherwise known as Baby Kerrigan (1915–1924), was a 5-months-old when she featured as the baby in this film. Baby Kerrigan was born Virginia Richdale Kerrigan on November 4, 1915, to Universal film executive William Wallace Kerrigan and Nina Richdale. She was the niece of the actor J. Warren Kerrigan and his sister actress Kathleen Kerrigan. She earned $5.00 per day (equivalent to $76 in 2019) making films for universal. At one time, she was the youngest featured player in the world. She was noted for the fact she never cries. She would be cast next in In His Service, released as Good and Evil in August 1916. She died a tragic death 9 years later in Los Angeles, on December 27, 1924, from burns sustained when her clothing caught fire after she passed near the flame of a gas heater

==== Director ====
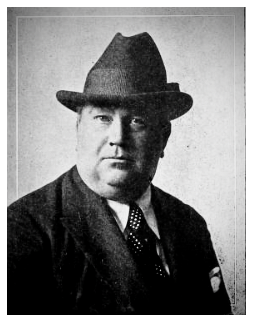
Director Lloyd B. Carleton

Lloyd B. Carleton (c. 1872–1933) started working for Carl Laemmle in the Fall of 1915. Carleton arrived with impeccable credentials, having directed some 60 films for the likes of Thanhouser, Lubin, Fox, and Selig.

Between March and December 1916, 44-year-old Lloyd Carleton directed 16 movies for Universal, starting with The Yaqui and ending with The Morals of Hilda released on December 11, 1916. Emory Johnson acted in all 16 of these films. Of Carleton's total 1916 output, 11 were feature films, and the rest were two-reel shorts. After Emory Johnson signed his Universal contract in early 1916, Carl Laemmle, the owner of Universal Pictures, thought he had found a new leading man. Laemmle was looking for a male lead like Wallace Reid. He also wanted to develop a cinematic pair that would captivate audiences.

Johnson became Laemmle's choice for his new leading man. Laemmle chose Dorothy Davenport to spark screen chemistry with Johnson. She was a Universal contract player who was Wallace Reid's wife. Universal's top director, Lloyd B. Carleton, was tasked by Laemmle to direct all of this pair's films.

The collaboration of Johnson and Davenport resulted in 13 films, beginning with the release of Doctor Neighbor in May 1916. The last film in the series was The Devil's Bondwoman, released in November 1916. The majority of the movies were feature films. All the films featured Johnson and Davenport as the main stars.

Davenport became pregnant in October 1916, and her film output dropped sharply in early 1917. In the end, Laemmle felt Johnson was not talented nor charismatic enough. He would not be Universal's version of Wally Reid. Laemmle felt that the films needed more screen chemistry, even if they made money. In June 1918, Universal failed to renew the contract of Emory Johnson.

The table below lists the 13 films Johnson and Davenport collaborated on.

◆ Films starring Emory Johnson and Dorothy Davenport in 1916 ◆
Title	Released	Director	Davenport role	Johnson role	Type	Time	LOC	Brand	Notes
Doctor Neighbor	1 May	Carleton	Hazel Rogers	Hamilton Powers	Drama	Feature	lost	Red Feather	
Her Husband's Faith	11 May	Carleton	Mabel Otto	Richard Otto	Drama	Short	lost	Universal	
Heartaches	18 May	Carleton	Virginia Payne	S Jackson Hunt	Drama	Short	lost	Universal	
Two Mothers	1 Jun	Carleton	Violetta Andree	2nd Husband	Drama	Short	lost	Universal	
Her Soul's Song	15 Jun	Carleton	Mary Salsbury	Paul Chandos	Drama	Short	lost	Universal	
The Way of the World	3 Jul	Carleton	Beatrice Farley	Walter Croyden	Drama	Feature	lost	Red Feather	
No. 16 Martin Street	13 Jul	Carleton	Cleo	Jacques Fournier	Drama	Short	lost	Universal	
A Yoke of Gold	14 Aug	Carleton	Carmen	Jose Garcia	Drama	Feature	lost	Red Feather	
The Unattainable	4 Sep	Carleton	Bessie Gale	Robert Goodman	Drama	Feature	1 of 5 reels	Bluebird	
Black Friday	18 Sep	Carleton	Elionor Rossitor	Charles Dalton	Drama	Feature	lost	Red Feather	
The Human Gamble	8 Oct	Carleton	Flavia Hill	Charles Hill	Drama	Short	lost	Universal	
Barriers of Society	10 Oct	Carleton	Martha Gorham	Westie Phillips	Drama	Feature	1 of 5 reels	Red Feather	
The Devil's Bondwoman	11 Nov	Carleton	Beverly Hope	Mason Van Horton	Drama	Feature	lost	Red Feather	

==== Screenplay ====
Betty Schade (1895–1982) was 21 years-old when she created this story. A Motion Picture News article stated "She is fond of reading, music and tennis. She has written several scenarios including Her Soul's Song."

The screenplay was developed by Calder Johnstone (1880–1958) who started writing scenarios in 1914. Johnstone (1880–1958) was 36 years old when this film was released. He would go on to write the adaptation for A Yoke of Gold and both the story and adaptation for The Human Gamble.

=== Filming ===
On March 15, 1915, Laemmle opened the world's largest motion picture production facility, Universal City Studios. Since this film required no location shooting, it was filmed in its entirety at the new studio complex.

==== Working title ====
When films enter production, they need the means to reference the project. A Working title is assigned to the project. A Working Title can also be named an Alternate title. In many cases, a working title will become the release title.
Working titles are used primarily for two reasons:

- An official title for the project has not been determined
- A non-descript title to mask the real reason for making the movie.

Based on an article in the Motion Picture News dated May 13, 1916 the working title for this film was The Double Sacrifice.

== Release and reception ==
=== Official release ===
The copyright was filed with U.S. Copyright Office on June 6, 1916. and entered into the record as shown: (Note: The copyright was filed with U.S. Copyright Office and entered into the record as shown: HER SOUL'S SONG. 1916 2 reels. Credits: Producer, L B. Carleton; story Betty Schade; scenario, Calder Johnstone. © Universal Film Mfg. Co., Inc.; 6 Jun 16; LP8439) and officially released on June 15, 1916.

=== Advertising ===
In 1916, movie companies spent more advertising dollars marketing feature films than promoting short films. A brief synopsis along with release dates was the norm for a short film while reserving the full-page ads for features. Universal recommended short films should be shown in conjunction with other short films to create a "diversified program."

Shown below is a quote from a Universal advertisement placed in Motion Picture News promoting this film along with several others:

Her Soul's Song With Dorothy Davenport and Emory Johnson. The stars of this beautiful little drama have shown what they could do in heavy emotional work time and again. This story of an opera singer who gave up her career for love and who lost her voice when the baby came; who regained it under the most peculiar conditions, is so absorbingly human that it is positively universal in its appeal to the finer emotions of the heart. Abounding in heartthrobs, it will please any audience.

The newspaper ad showed Her Soul's Song playing along with two other films. The other films are:

- Thomas Jefferson and Lina Basquette starring the one-reel drama Brother Jim.
- Matt Moore and Jane Gail starring the one-reel comedy A Double Fire Deception.

Referencing "The Universal Program" detailed above, this is an example of a "diversified program."

=== Reviews ===
Lengthy detailed reviews for short films were rare. The Hollywood magazines primarily reviewed feature films and only gave short films honorable mention. Of course, in 1916, movie magazines were evolving and becoming more sophisticated like the movies they checked and advertised.

In the June 17, 1916 issue of The Moving Picture World, the movie staff reviewed the film:

The story is a good one and is given a fine presentation. The ornamented title and subtitles are decidedly artistic, and the two principals are pleasing. The baby also shares the honors, being uncommonly attractive.

In the June 17, 1916 issue of The Moving Picture World, under the section - Tabloid Reviews for the Busy Exhibitor:

This drama, though seemingly wildly impossible, makes very good entertainment. The subtitles are written across the scenes in most instances. Dorothy Davenport and Emory Johnson are the principals.

== Preservation status ==
Many silent-era films did not survive for reasons as explained on this Wikipedia page. (Note: Film is history. With every foot of film lost, we lose a link to our culture, the world around us, each other, and ourselves. – Martin Scorsese, filmmaker, director NFPF Board A report by Library of Congress film historian and archivist David Pierce estimates that: around 75% of original silent-era films have perished; 14% of the 10,919 silent films released by major studios exist in their original 35 mm or other formats; 11% survive only in full-length foreign versions or film formats of lesser image quality.)

According to the Library of Congress, all known copies of this film are lost.

== Gallery ==
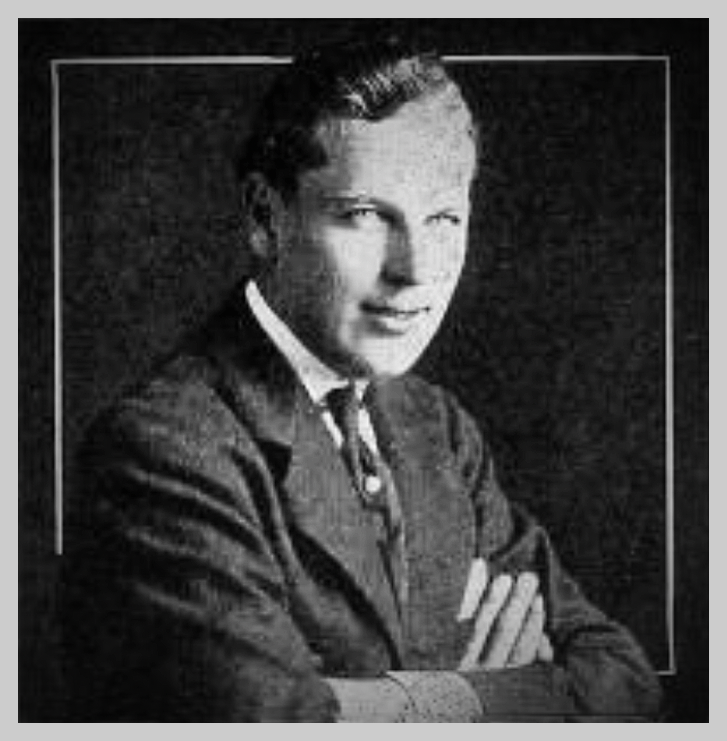
Emory Johnson in 1916

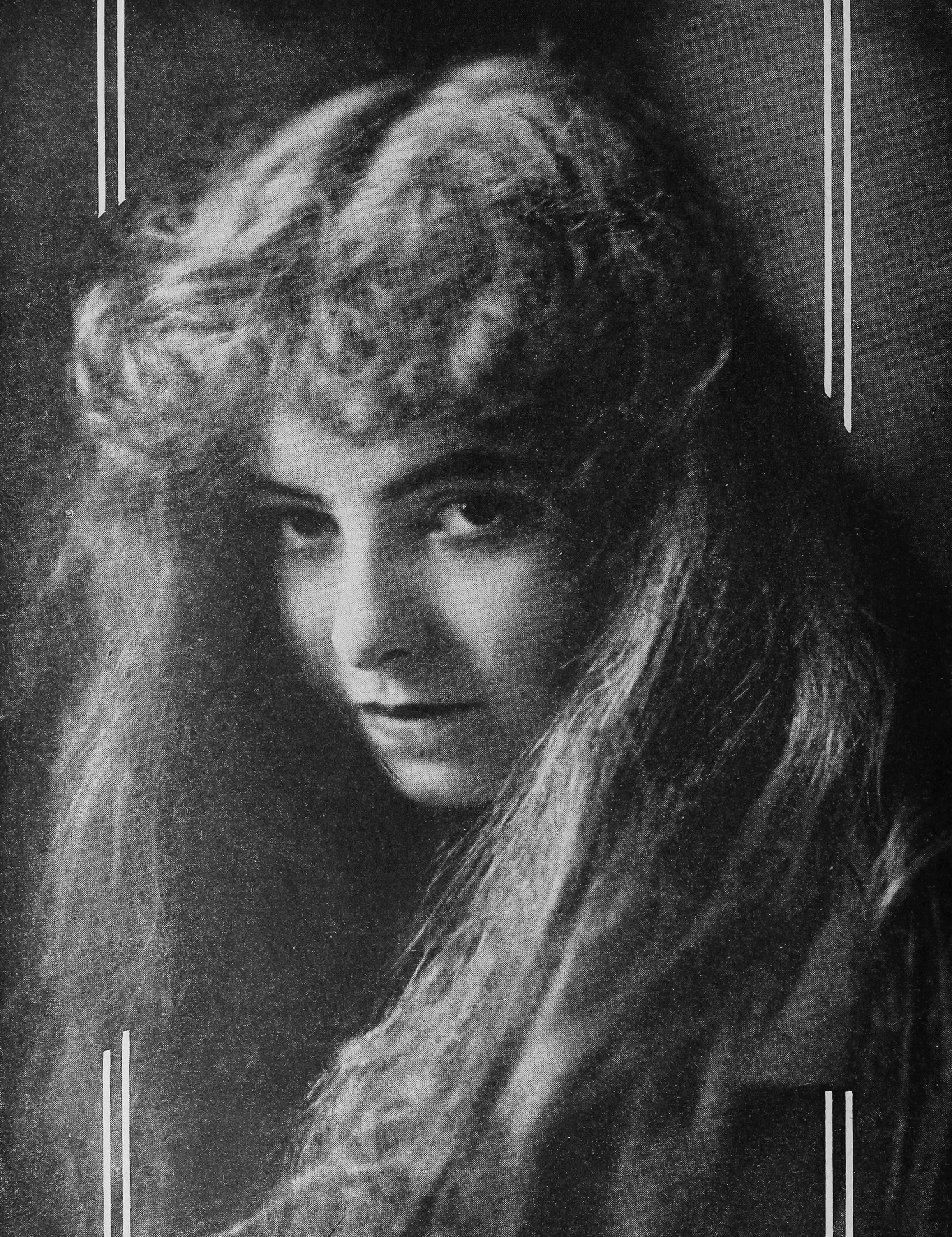
Dorothy Davenport in 1914

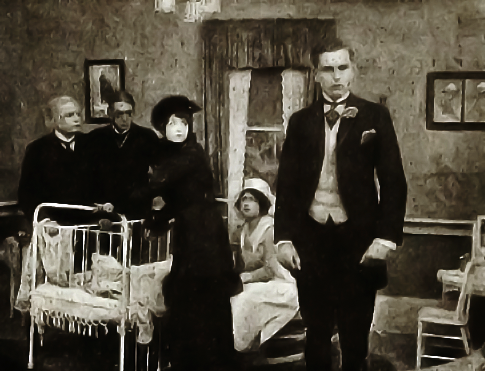
Her_Soul's_Song_Still01

== Sources ==
- Braff, R.E. (1999). The Universal Silents: A Filmography of the Universal Motion Picture Manufacturing Company, 1912-1929. McFarland. ISBN 978-0-7864-0287-8.
- Fleming, E.J. (2010). Wallace Reid: The Life and Death of a Hollywood Idol. McFarland. ISBN 978-0-7864-8266-5.
- Hirschhorn, Clive (1983). The Universal Story - The Complete History of the Studio and its 2,641 films. New York: Crown Publishing Group. pp. 22–23. ISBN 0-517-55001-6.
- Keil, C.; Stamp, S. (2004). American Cinema's Transitional Era: Audiences, Institutions, Practices. ACLS Humanities E-Book. University of California Press. ISBN 978-0-520-24027-8.
