= Heartaches (1916 film) =

1916 movie by Lloyd B. Carleton

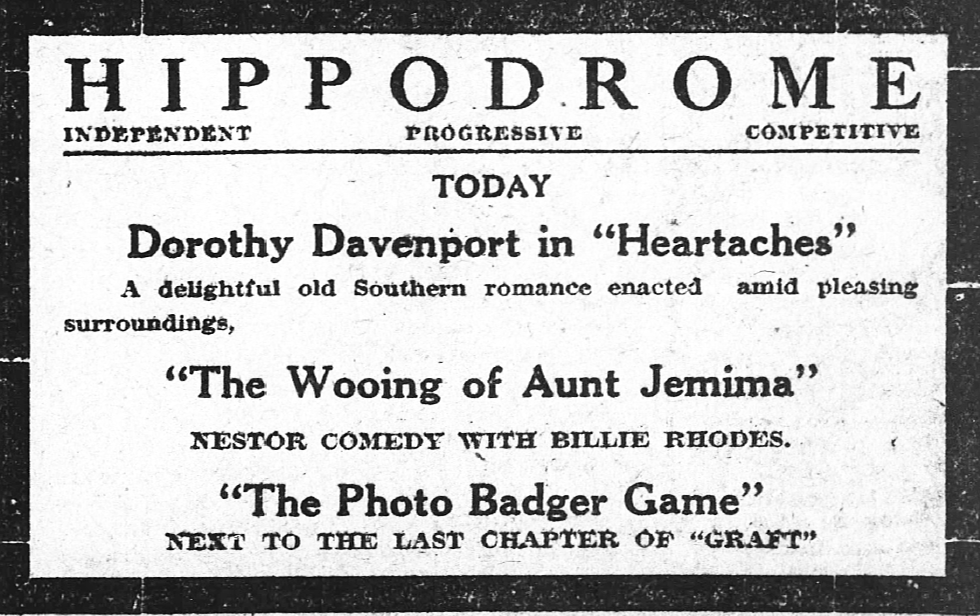
- Heartaches newspaper ad
- Directed by: Lloyd B. Carleton
- Written by: Grant Carpenter
- Produced by: Lloyd B. Carleton
- Starring: Dorothy Davenport; Emory Johnson
- Production company: Universal
- Distributed by: Universal
- Release date: May 19, 1916
- Running time: 15–24 minutes (2 reels)
- Country: United States
- Languages: Silent film (English intertitles)

Heartaches is a 1916 American silent short film directed by Lloyd B. Carleton. The film is based on a story by Grant Carpenter. This drama's features Dorothy Davenport, Alfred Allen, and Emory Johnson.

This story is about an old Southern plantation owner reminiscing how a minor quarrel destroyed the relationship with the love of his life. When his grandson has a minor argument with his girlfriend and seeks advice from his grandfather, the grandfather related his story of lost love and told his grandson to patch things up quickly.

The film was released on May 19, 1916, by Universal.

== Plot ==
Stonewall Jackson (Jack) Hunt attends Harvard University where, besides his studies, he also runs track. One day, he receives a letter from his grandfather, Judge Randolph. The judge's letter informs Jack he can no longer send money to support his education. The judge explains his Virginia plantation is now fully mortgaged. He only remains on the plantation through the good graces of the mortgage holder - The New York Trust Company. While traveling to a competition, Jack catches his first glimpse of the younger Virginia Payne. It intrigues him.

Virginia Payne lives in Cambridge, Massachusetts, with her grandmother, who uses a wheelchair, Virginia Warrington Payne. Virginia has decided to attend a local college meet. Before she leaves home, she gives her grandmother and her old silk purse, which she always keeps close by, and puts an old gown of her youth on a nearby chair. Virginia's friends pick her up, and they head to the games. During the meet, she sees Jack for the first time. After a while, she starts cheering for him.

While her granddaughter is away, her grandmother dreams about her old sweetheart and how they parted, never to see each other again. Then she sighed and went to sleep. She would never awake. At the same time, Judge Randolph is sitting in front of his fireplace. He is dreaming about the love of his life and how he lets her slip away.

When Virginia returns home, she finds her grandmother has passed away. Her grandmother is holding a packet. An attached note says Virginia should not open this package until she is engaged. Virginia also finds a letter addressed to Judge William Randolph. She mails the letter. When the judge receives the letter, he finds out Virginia is now alone in the world. Virginia's grandmother then asked Judge Randolph if he could protect Virginia for old time's sake. The judge wires Virginia to travel to his plantation.

Jack is desperate for money, so he enters a poker game. He loses everything. Jack finds out where Virginia lives and decides on a visit. Jack becomes concerned when he sees crepe draped all over the house and is relieved to find out it is for Virginia's grandmother. With no money and no prospects, he decided to return to his grandfather's plantation in Virginia. On the same day, Jack decides to return to his grandfather's plantation; unbeknownst to Jack, Virginia is traveling to the same destination. Jack tries to ride for free with the baggage but is caught and thrown off the train. Amid the chaos, Virginia recognized Jack, learns of his circumstances, and offers to pay his fare. Jack refuses at first, then finds out they are both headed to his grandfather's plantation. He then accepts Virginia's offer.

It surprises the judge when they both show up at his front door. The judge is amazed at the resemblance of Virginia to her grandmother. The judge soon learns Jack has gambled away everything. The judge tells Jack if he wants to live like a gentleman, he will need to work on the plantation alongside the other laborers. Jack has no choice but to accept.

Soon after that, the judge discovers Jack and Virginia kissing in the back of a shed. The judge warns Jack not to trifle with her affections. Jack assures the judge that will never happen. Soon the young lovers have a squabble over some petty matter. A concerned judge chooses to impart some of his wisdom.

The judge tells Virginia:

Nothing is the beginning - Nothing is the end - but many heartaches lie between.

The judge then relates how a minor quarrel led to a breakup with the women he loved more than life itself. They never got back together. He never stopped loving her and will until the day he dies. He then tells Virginia the woman he loved was her grandmother. Virginia is overcome with emotion and begs the judge to talk to Jack.

The judge speaks to Jack and tells him to apologize to Virginia. After some persuasive back-and-forth, Jack leaves to find Virginia. When he finds her, she is dressed in her grandmother's old gown, the same dress her grandmother wore when she broke up with the judge. Jack says he is genuinely sorry for the quarrel. They engage in a warm embrace.

Virginia feels now is the time to open the sealed packet her grandmother left her. The pack contains the mortgage from Judge Randolph to the New York Trust Company. The mortgage is paid in full, and the property is assigned to her grandmother. Virginia recognizes her grandmother had lived a frugal life to save the judge's plantation. While still wearing her grandmother's gown, she takes the mortgage to Judge Randolph. The judge imagines he sees Virginia Warrington and realizes that Virginia's grandmother never stopped loving him.

== Cast ==
Actor	Role
Dorothy Davenport	Virginia Payne
Helen Wright	Virginia Warrington Payne (Virginia's Grandmother)
Emory Johnson	Stonewall Jackson (Jack) Hunt
Alfred Allen	Judge William Randolph (Jack's Grandfather)

== Production ==
=== Pre production ===
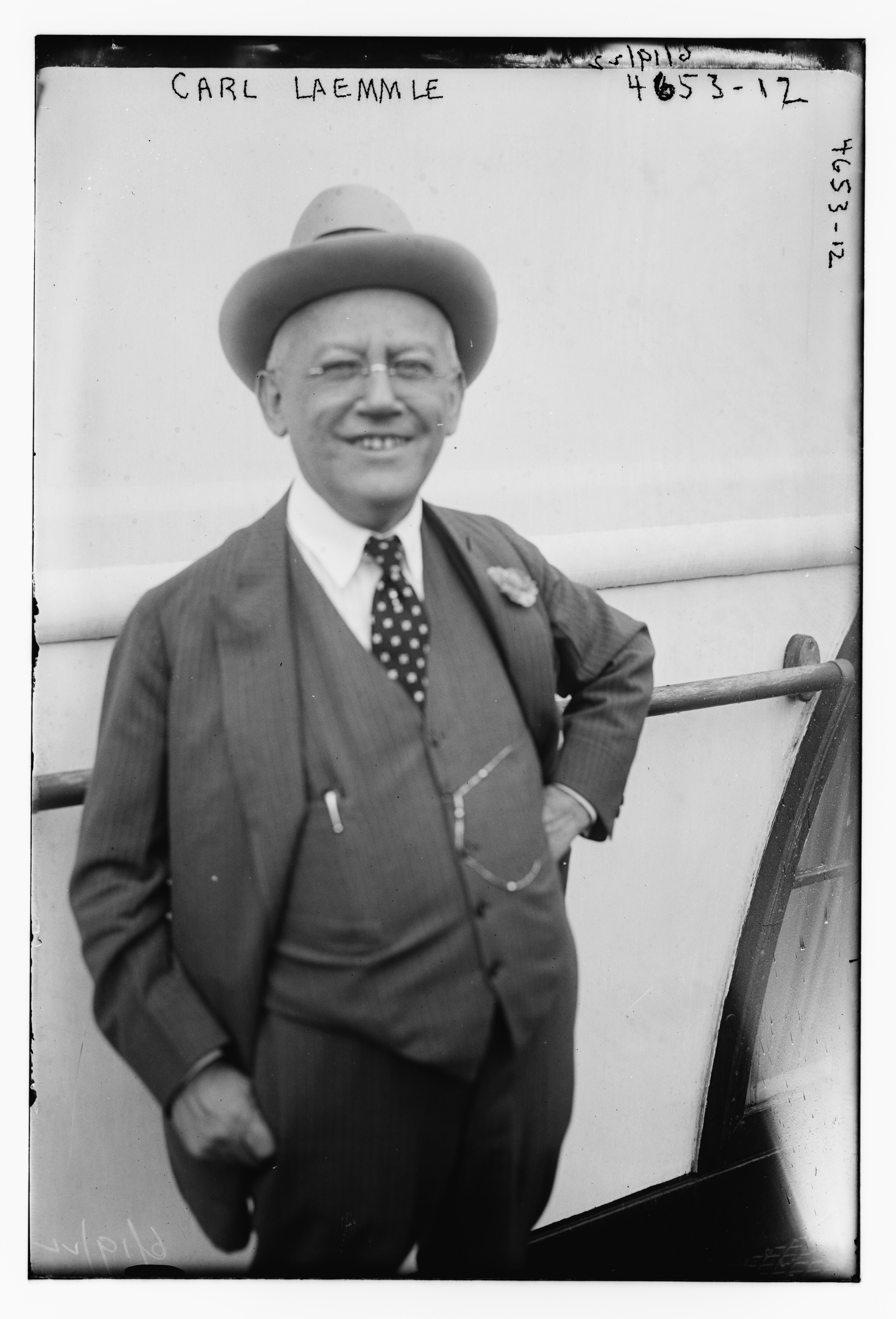
Carl Laemmle in 1918

Universal Logo 1915

In the book, "American Cinema's Transitional Era," the authors point out, The years between 1908 and 1917 witnessed what may have been the most significant transformation in American film history. During this "transitional era," widespread changes affected film form and film genres, filmmaking practices and industry structure, exhibition sites, and audience demographics. One aspect of this transition was the longer duration of films. Feature films (Note: A "feature film" or "feature-length film" is a narrative film (motion picture or "movie") with a running time long enough to be considered the principal or sole presentation in a commercial entertainment program. A film can be distributed as a feature film if it equals or exceeds a specified minimum running time and satisfies other defined criteria. The minimum time depends on the governing agency. The American Film Institute and the British Film Institute require films to have a minimum running time of forty minutes or longer. Other film agencies, e.g.,Screen Actors Guild, require a film's running time to be 60 minutes or greater. Currently, most feature films are between 70 and 210 minutes long.) were slowly becoming the standard fare for Hollywood producers. Before 1913, you could count the yearly features on two hands. Between 1915 and 1916, the number of feature movies rose 2 ½ times or from 342 films to 835. There was a recurring claim that Carl Laemmle was the longest-running studio chief resisting the production of feature films. Universal was not ready to downsize its short film business because short films were cheaper, faster, and more profitable to produce than feature films. (Note: " Short Film" - There are no defined parameters for a Short film except for one immutable rule -the film's maximum running time. The Academy of Motion Picture Arts and Sciences defines a short film as "an original motion picture that has a running time of 40 minutes or less, including all credits".)

Laemmle would continue to buck this trend while slowly increasing his output of features. In 1914, Laemmle published an essay titled - Doom of long Features Predicted. In 1915, Laemmle ran an advertisement extolling Bluebird films while adding the following vocabulary on the top of the ad. (Note: The moving picture business is here to stay. That you must admit, despite carping critics and blundering sore-heads, true, some exhibitors have found business so good lately — but if you get down to facts when you look for a reason why, it's a 100 to 1 shot that they are, and for some time have been, dallying with a feature program. Some of these wise ones will tell you that business has picked up since they went into features, — BUT — ask them whether they are talking NET or GROSS. They will find they have an immediate appointment and terminate your queries unceremoniously. Funny how we like to kid ourselves, isn't it? The man who is packing 'em in and losing money on features is envied by his competitor, who is laying by a bit every day, and has a good steady, dependable patronage but admits to a few vacant seats at some performances. When this chap wakes up, he will realize that he has a gold mine and that good advertising will make it produce to capacity. The moral is that if you can tie up to the Universal Program, DO IT. If you can't NOW, watch your first chance. Let the people know what you have, and let the feature man go on to ruin if he wants to. You should worry! Motion Picture News - May 6, 1916) Carl Laemmle released 100 feature-length films in 1916, as stated in Clive Hirschhorn's book, The Universal Story.

==== Casting ====
- Dorothy Davenport (1895-1977) was an established star for Universal when the 21 year-old actress played Virginia Payne. She had acted in hundreds of movies by the time she starred in this film. The majority of these films were 2-reel shorts, as was the norm in Hollywood's teen years. She had been making movies since 1910. She started dating Wally Reid when she was barely 16, and he was 20. They married in 1913. After her husband died in 1923, she used the name "Mrs. Wallace Reid" in the credits for any project she took part in. Besides being an actress, she would eventually become a film director, producer, and writer.
- Emory Johnson (1894-1960) was 22 years old when he acted in this movie as Stonewall Jackson (Jack) Hunt. In January 1916, Emory signed a contract with Universal Film Manufacturing Company. Carl Laemmle of Universal Film Manufacturing Company thought he saw great potential in Johnson, so he chooses him to be Universal's new leading man. Laemmle's hope was Johnson would become another Wallace Reed. A major part of his plan was to create a movie couple that would sizzle on the silver screen. Laemmle thought Dorothy Davenport and Emory Johnson could create the chemistry he sought. Johnson and Davenport would complete 13 films together. They started with the successful feature production of Doctor Neighbor in May 1916 and ended with The Devil's Bondwoman in November 1916. After completing the last movie, Laemmle thought Johnson did not have the screen presence he wanted. He decided not to renew his contract. Johnson would make 17 movies in 1916, including 6 shorts and 11 feature-length Dramas. 1916 would become the second-highest movie output of his entire acting career. Emory acted in 25 films for Universal, mostly dramas with a sprinkling of comedies and westerns.
- Alfred Allen (1866-1947) was 50 years old when he was selected to play Judge William Randolph. He was a logical choice to play a judge since he was highly educated, had a commanding presence and stood six feet, and weighed two hundred pounds. He got his start in the film industry at Universal city in 1913. He landed his first role in 1915. His roles were character parts, and he played mostly fathers, villains, or ranch owners. Alfred Allen appeared in 69 features from 1916 through 1929. After Heartaches he would appear in four more Davenport-Johnson projects: A Yoke of Gold, The Unattainable, The Human Gamble and Barriers of Society.
- Helen Wright (1868-1928) was 47 years old when she acted in this movie playing Virginia Warrington Payne. Helen Wright (born Helen Boyd) was a well-known Universal character actress who appeared mostly in silent films between 1915 and 1930. She spent most of her career under contract at Universal. She would later appear with Emory Johnson in the Universal production of The Morals of Hilda.

==== Director ====
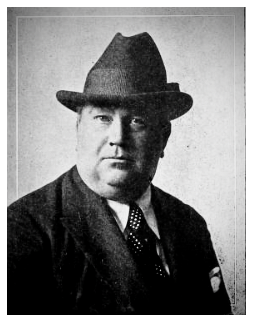
Director Lloyd B. Carleton

Lloyd B. Carleton (c. 1872–1933) started working for Carl Laemmle in the Fall of 1915. Carleton arrived with impeccable credentials, having directed some 60 films for the likes of Thanhouser, Lubin, Fox, and Selig.

Between March and December 1916, 44-year-old Lloyd Carleton directed 16 movies for Universal, starting with The Yaqui and ending with The Morals of Hilda released on December 11, 1916. Emory Johnson acted in all 16 of these films. Of Carleton's total 1916 output, 11 were feature films, and the rest were two-reel shorts. After Emory Johnson signed his Universal contract in early 1916, Carl Laemmle, the owner of Universal Pictures, thought he had found a new leading man. Laemmle was looking for a male lead like Wallace Reid. He also wanted to develop a cinematic pair that would captivate audiences.

Johnson became Laemmle's choice for his new leading man. Laemmle chose Dorothy Davenport to spark screen chemistry with Johnson. She was a Universal contract player who was Wallace Reid's wife. Universal's top director, Lloyd B. Carleton, was tasked by Laemmle to direct all of this pair's films.

The collaboration of Johnson and Davenport resulted in 13 films, beginning with the release of Doctor Neighbor in May 1916. The last film in the series was The Devil's Bondwoman, released in November 1916. The majority of the movies were feature films. All the films featured Johnson and Davenport as the main stars.

Davenport became pregnant in October 1916, and her film output dropped sharply in early 1917. In the end, Laemmle felt Johnson was not talented nor charismatic enough. He would not be Universal's version of Wally Reid. Laemmle felt that the films needed more screen chemistry, even if they made money. In June 1918, Universal failed to renew the contract of Emory Johnson.

The table below lists the 13 films Johnson and Davenport collaborated on.

◆ Films starring Emory Johnson and Dorothy Davenport in 1916 ◆
Title	Released	Director	Davenport role	Johnson role	Type	Time	LOC	Brand	Notes
Doctor Neighbor	1 May	Carleton	Hazel Rogers	Hamilton Powers	Drama	Feature	lost	Red Feather	
Her Husband's Faith	11 May	Carleton	Mabel Otto	Richard Otto	Drama	Short	lost	Universal	
Heartaches	18 May	Carleton	Virginia Payne	S Jackson Hunt	Drama	Short	lost	Universal	
Two Mothers	1 Jun	Carleton	Violetta Andree	2nd Husband	Drama	Short	lost	Universal	
Her Soul's Song	15 Jun	Carleton	Mary Salsbury	Paul Chandos	Drama	Short	lost	Universal	
The Way of the World	3 Jul	Carleton	Beatrice Farley	Walter Croyden	Drama	Feature	lost	Red Feather	
No. 16 Martin Street	13 Jul	Carleton	Cleo	Jacques Fournier	Drama	Short	lost	Universal	
A Yoke of Gold	14 Aug	Carleton	Carmen	Jose Garcia	Drama	Feature	lost	Red Feather	
The Unattainable	4 Sep	Carleton	Bessie Gale	Robert Goodman	Drama	Feature	1 of 5 reels	Bluebird	
Black Friday	18 Sep	Carleton	Elionor Rossitor	Charles Dalton	Drama	Feature	lost	Red Feather	
The Human Gamble	8 Oct	Carleton	Flavia Hill	Charles Hill	Drama	Short	lost	Universal	
Barriers of Society	10 Oct	Carleton	Martha Gorham	Westie Phillips	Drama	Feature	1 of 5 reels	Red Feather	
The Devil's Bondwoman	11 Nov	Carleton	Beverly Hope	Mason Van Horton	Drama	Feature	lost	Red Feather	

==== Screenplay ====
The movie is based on a story written by 51 year old Louis Grant Carpenter (1865–1936). Carpenter had worked as a newspaperman and an attorney. In 1916, he moved to Manhattan, New York City, to embark upon a new career as a writer.

=== Filming ===
On March 15, 1915, Laemmle opened the world's largest motion picture production facility, Universal City Studios. Since this film required no location shooting, it was filmed in its entirety at the new studio complex.

==== Working title ====
When films enter production, they need the means to reference the project. A Working title is assigned to the project. A Working Title can also be named an Alternate title. In many cases, a working title will become the release title.
Working titles are used primarily for two reasons:

- An official title for the project has not been determined
- A non-descript title to mask the real reason for making the movie.

The Laemmle 2-reel short film of Heartaches should not be confused with the 1915 feature film Heartaches. The 1915 4-reel production was directed by Joseph Kaufman and produced by Lubin. The film starred Vinnie Burns and Jessie Terry. The film was released on December 20, 1915. Releasing movies with identical names is uncommon, but the six-month difference in these two films' release dates is unique. There are no copyright listings for Lubin's 1915 Heartaches in either the individual movie listings or the section sorted by producing companies in the Catalog of Copyright Entries. Movie title names can not be copyrighted.

== Release and reception ==
=== Official release ===
The film was copyrighted on May 12, 1916 (Note: The copyright was filed with U.S. Copyright Office and entered into the record as shown: HEARTACHES. Laemmle. 1916. 2 reels. Credits: Grant Carpenter; producer, L. B. Carleton. © Universal Film Mfg. Co., Inc.; 12May16; LP8277.) and officially released on May 19, 1916.

=== Advertising ===
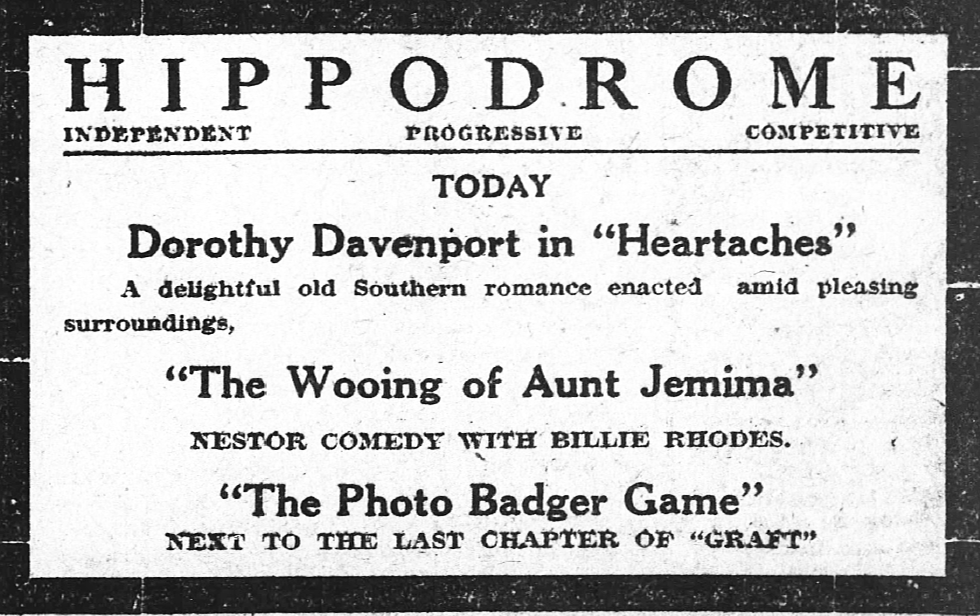
Carl Laemmle 1918

In 1916, advertising money spent on short films was minimal compared to feature films. A brief synopsis was the norm. Short films were shown in conjunction with other short films to create a "diversified program." In this case, a newspaper ad showed Heartaches playing along with two other films. The other films are:

- Betty Compson starring one-reel production of The Wooing of Aunt Jemima (1916) at IMDb.
- The 19th installment of the serial Graft, with the two-reel production of - The Photo Badger Game (1916) at IMDb.

=== Reviews ===
In the May 20, 1916 issue of the Moving Picture World, the reviewer writes:

"A two-reel number, by Grant Carpenter, featuring Emory Johnson, Alfred Allen, and Dorothy Davenport. This is a tale of an old Southern plantation in which the owner tells the girl how his romance was shattered as the result of a quarrel over nothing. This induces the girl to return to her lover and patch up their differences. There is no particular novelty of plot in this; it is just a pretty story of a sentimental sort, enacted by a pleasing cast amid attractive surroundings."

In the May 24, 1916 issue of the Fort Worth Star-Telegram, the reviewer writes:

"This story is an unusually pretty one, which shows many scenes at Harvard university, scenes of the present days, scenes of the days of the sixties, and has a romance that is most interesting."

== Preservation status ==
Many silent-era films did not survive for reasons as explained on this Wikipedia page. (Note: Film is history. With every foot of film lost, we lose a link to our culture, the world around us, each other, and ourselves. – Martin Scorsese, filmmaker, director NFPF Board A report by Library of Congress film historian and archivist David Pierce estimates that: around 75% of original silent-era films have perished; 14% of the 10,919 silent films released by major studios exist in their original 35 mm or other formats; 11% survive only in full-length foreign versions or film formats of lesser image quality.)

According to the Library of Congress, all known copies of this film are lost.

== Gallery ==
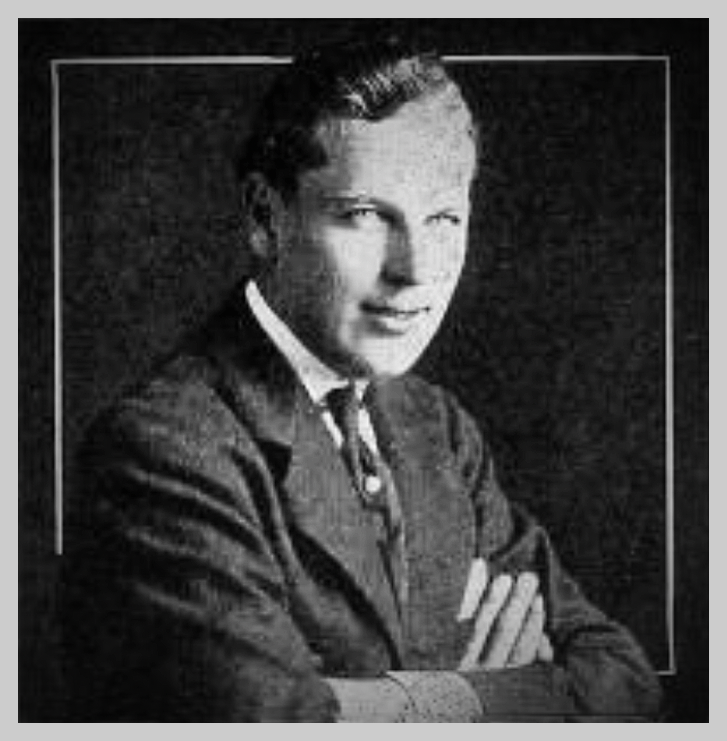
Emory Johnson in 1916

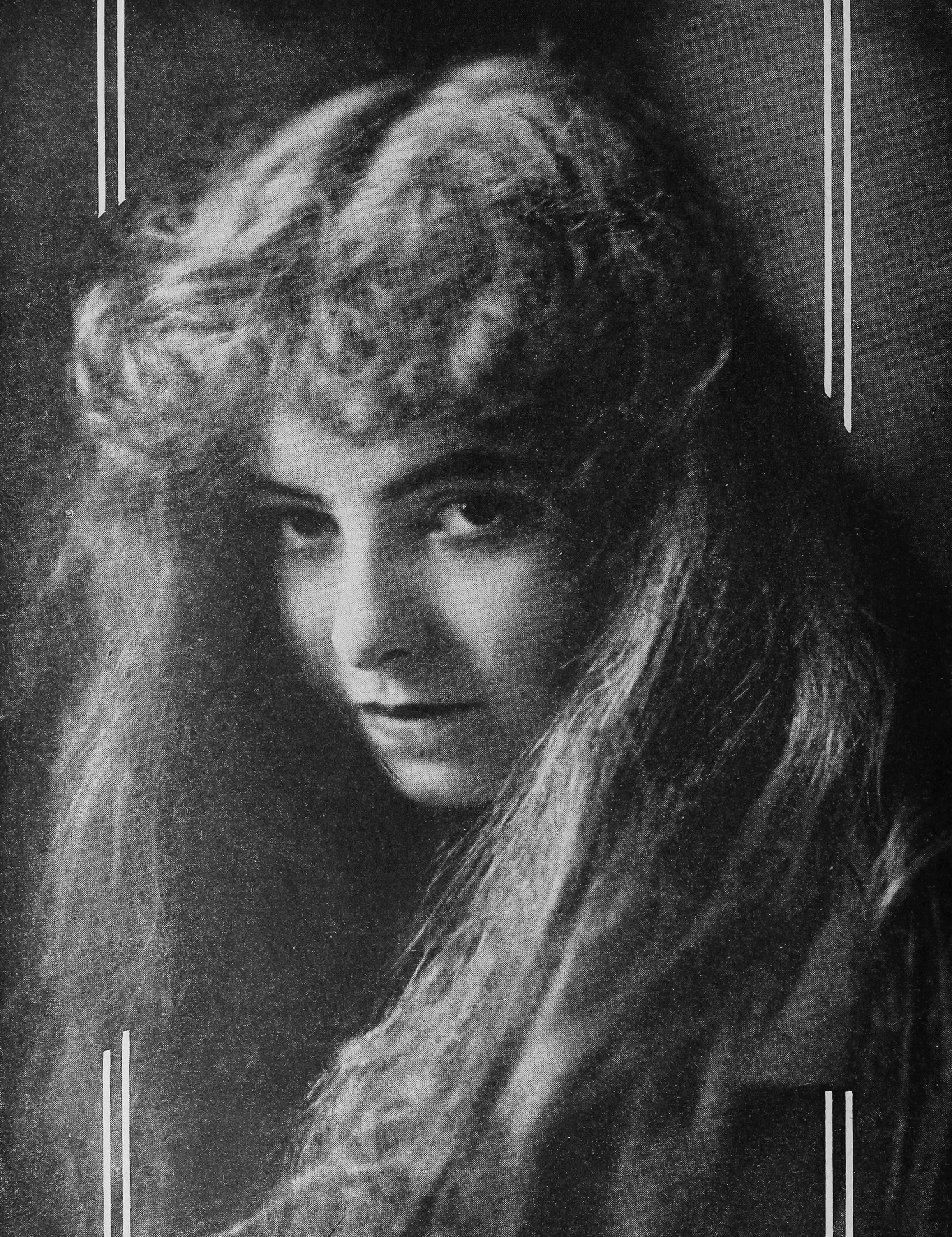
Dorothy Davenport in 1914

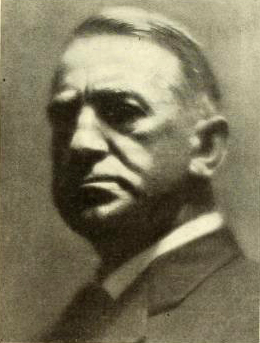
Alfred Allen in 1919

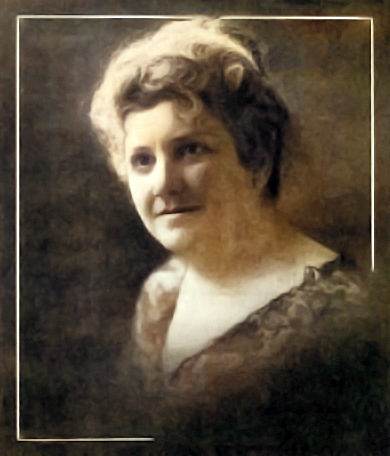
Helen Wright in 1916

== Sources ==
- Braff, R.E. (1999). The Universal Silents: A Filmography of the Universal Motion Picture Manufacturing Company, 1912-1929. McFarland. ISBN 978-0-7864-0287-8.
- Fleming, E.J. (2010). Wallace Reid: The Life and Death of a Hollywood Idol. McFarland. ISBN 978-0-7864-8266-5.
- Hirschhorn, Clive (1983). The Universal Story - The Complete History of the Studio and its 2,641 films. New York: Crown Publishing Group. pp. 22–23. ISBN 0-517-55001-6.
- Katchmer, G.A. (2015). A Biographical Dictionary of Silent Film Western Actors and Actresses. McFarland, Incorporated, Publishers. ISBN 978-1-4766-0905-8.
- Keil, C.; Stamp, S. (2004). American Cinema's Transitional Era: Audiences, Institutions, Practices. ACLS Humanities E-Book. University of California Press. ISBN 978-0-520-24027-8.
