= A Yoke of Gold =

1916 film directed by Lloyd Carleton

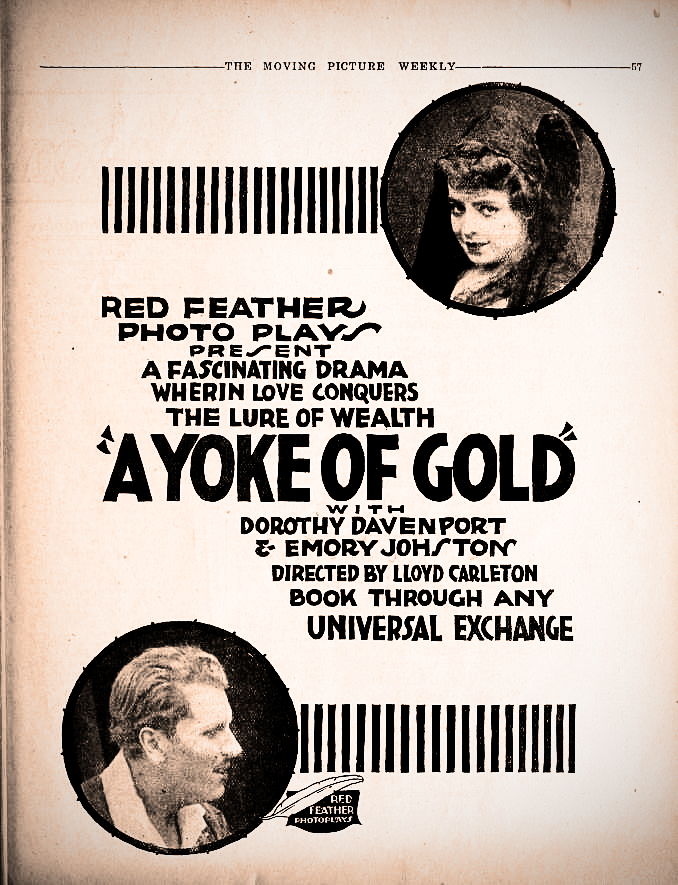
- Moving Picture Weekly ad
- Directed by: Lloyd B. Carleton
- Screenplay by: Calder Johnstone
- Story by: Rob Wagner
- Produced by: Universal Red Feather
- Starring: Emory Johnson; Dorothy Davenport
- Cinematography: Roy H. Klaffki
- Production company: Universal
- Distributed by: Universal
- Release date: August 14, 1916 (Universal City)
- Running time: 50–75 minutes (5 reels)
- Country: United States
- Language: English intertitles

A Yoke of Gold is a 1916 American silent black and white melodrama directed by Lloyd B. Carleton and starring Dorothy Davenport and Emory Johnson. Based on an original story by Rob Wagner, it is a period piece set in the early days of the California missions.

The movie was released on August 14, 1916, by Universal.

== Plot ==
Universal Studios set this melodrama between the years of 1834 and 1850. During this time in California's history, a vast economic gap existed. The elite kept accumulating more wealth, and those with little money declined further in position. The disadvantaged were under the A Yoke of Gold, i.e., the yoke of the aristocracy.

Luis Lopez is smarting under this aristocratic yoke. The fiery Luis wants to become the champion of the poor. Luis fancies himself as a local Robin Hood. Luis claims he wants to rob the rich and redistribute wealth among the poor.

Jose Garcia is content to live out his life in the sleepy outskirts of San Gabriel Mission. The gullible Jose falls under the spell of Luis's fiery rhetoric. Jose also becomes determined to find a way to help the less fortunate. Luis is sensing Jose's frustration, enlists Jose to assist him in pursuing his evil designs. Since they now share common goals, the two become fast friends. Luis and Jose start developing a plan to achieve their aims.

The plan comes together. Jose will rob wealthy landowner Don Ortega portrayed by Frank Whitting. Don Ortega lives in Santa Barbara, California. Luis will rob the wealthy Don Mendoza, who resides in "the valley of the seven moons". After the men have completed both break-ins, they will travel back to San Gabriel. They both swear to distribute all their ill-gotten gains to the poor.

Before Jose departs, he informs his devoted mother and Padre Amador of his plans. Padre Amador and leads the Santa Barbara Mission. Since he happens to be San Gabriel visiting friends, the padre gives Jose his blessing. The priest also slips a crucifix into Jose's backpack for good luck.

Jose has a significant obstacle. Before he can rob Don Ortega, he must first cross a burning desert to reach Santa Barbara. Jose starts a journey under the blistering sun. Soon, overcome with thirst, Jose stops for a drink of water. He discovers he has lost his canteen. Jose starts to search his backpack and finds the crucifix that Padre Amador had concealed. He grabs the cross and throws it into the sand. Jose realizes his fate is sealed and lays down in the sand, waiting for death.

As luck would have it, another party was traveling behind Jose and headed in the same direction. Castro Arrellanes and his beautiful daughter – Carmen, are traveling to visit Castro's cousin. In a bit of irony, Castro's cousin is none other than Don Ortega. They come across the crucifix half-buried in the sand. Later they discover the half-dead Jose. Jose is on the edge of death. Castro and Carmen decide to finish their journey and take Jose to Don Ortega's home to recover. After they arrive at Don Ortega's home, Carmen starts nursing Jose back to good health.

Now we turn our focus to Luis Lopez. Luis arrived at the home of Don Mendoza in the valley of the seven moons. He convinces Don Mendoza he has lost his way and requests lodging. The Mendozas take him in. After waiting for Mendoza and his wife to fall asleep, Lopez sneaks into the living room. He knows Don Mendoza has hidden bags of gold in a large chest. While stealing the gold, Mendoza's wife catches him in the act. Lopez attacks the woman, but the ensuing struggle wakes-up Don Mendoza. He rushes to his wife's aid and forces Lopez to flee. Lopez takes his gold and heads back to San Gabriel to meet up with Jose.

Jose continues to recuperate in Don Ortega's home under Carmen's tender care. But during Jose's healing process, Jose falls in love with Carmen. Now a man in love, Jose renounces his plans to rob the rich and give to the poor. Recovered, Jose heads back home to confront Luis and tell him of his change of heart.

Jose arrives in San Gabriel. Luis Lopez confronts him. Luis learns Jose had failed in his attempt to rob Ortega. Luis is beside himself with rage. Luis vows to steal Ortega's gold himself. In another starling turn, Jose learns, Lopez never intended to give the gold to the poor. From the start, Lopez had planned to keep all the gold for himself. Jose promises himself he will not be complicit in robbing those who had befriended him. Before Luis retires for the evening, he stashed the gold he stole from Mendoza under his pillow. Luis falls to sleep. Later in the evening, Jose sneaks into Lopez's room, takes the gold, and escapes into the darkness. Jose then secures a horse and heads for Don Ortega's home in Santa Barbara.

Luis discovers what has happened. He vows to pursue the traitorous Jose and kill him. Even though Jose has a head start, Luis believes he can beat Luis to Don Ortega's home.

Both Jose and Luis ride hard and fast across the desert to Santa Barbara - the home of Don Ortega. Jose wins the race and arrives before Luis. He warns Ortega of the impending robbery, and then both men lay a trap for Lopez. They catch him in the act.

Carmen enters the picture. She believes a caring heart is beneath Luis Lopez's wicked veneer. Carmen thinks Luis can be redeemed. She pleads with Luis to turn his life around. At Carmen's bidding, padre Amador has returned to Santa Barbara. He joins Carmen in trying to convince Luis to forsake his sinful life and repent. Suddenly, Luis sees the light, heeds the call, and reforms his evil ways. Luis decides to become a monk. He enters the Mission at Santa Barbara under Padre Amador's guidance. He will spend the rest of his days as a priest at the mission.

Later, Jose and Carmen get married and live in wedded bliss.

== Cast ==
Actor	Role
Dorothy Davenport	Carmen Arellanes
Emory Johnson	Jose Garcia
Alfred Allen	Luis Lopez
Richard Morris	Padre Amador
Harold Skinner	Castro Arellanes
Frank Whitting	Otega
Gretchen Lederer	Mrs. Mendoza

== Production ==
=== Pre-production ===
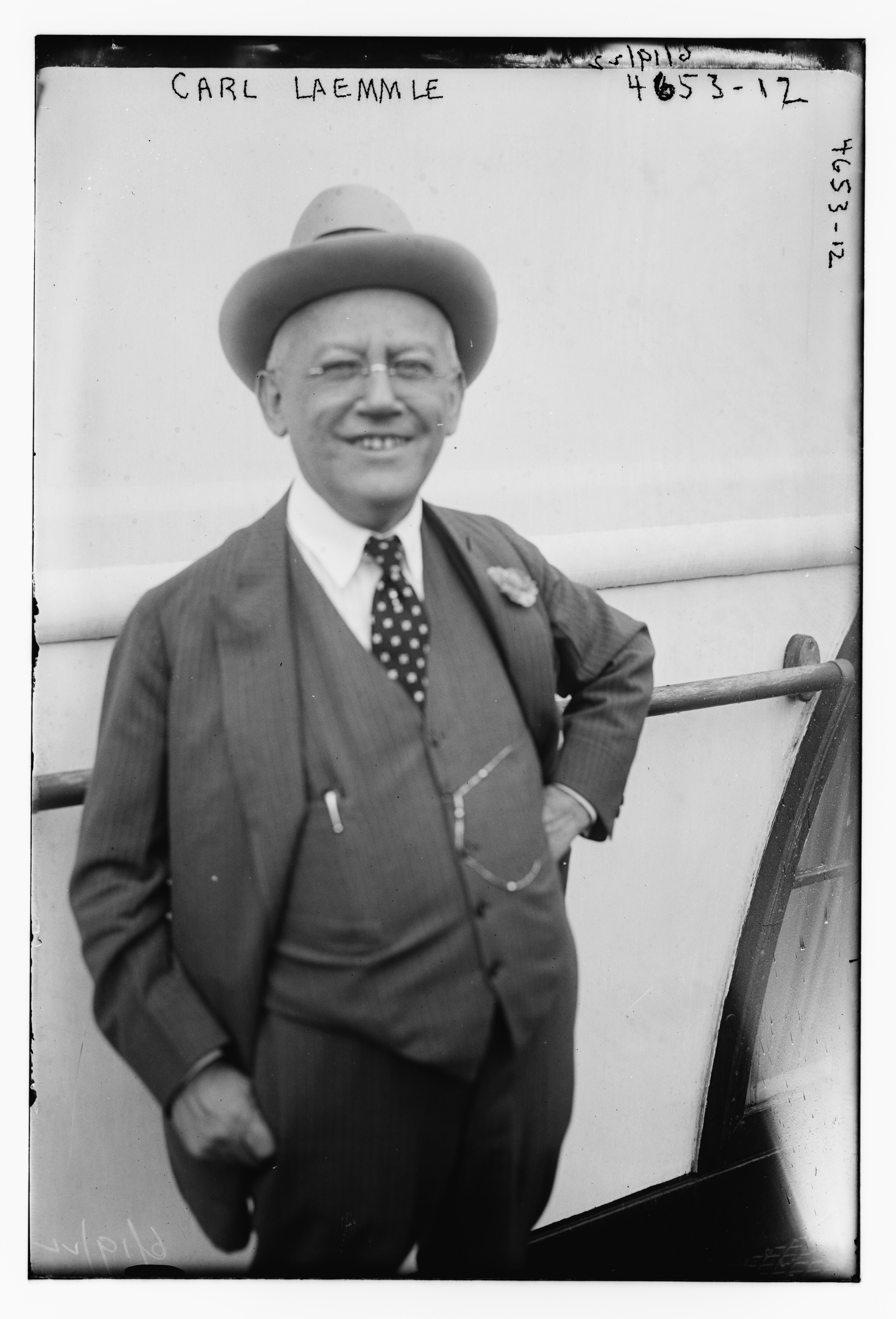
Carl Laemmle in 1918

Universal Logo 1915

In the book, "American Cinema's Transitional Era," the authors point out, The years between 1908 and 1917 witnessed what may have been the most significant transformation in American film history. During this "transitional era", widespread changes affected film form and film genres, filmmaking practices and industry structure, exhibition sites, and audience demographics. One aspect of this transition was the longer duration of films. Feature films (Note: A "feature film" or "feature-length film" is a narrative film (motion picture or "movie") with a running time long enough to be considered the principal or sole presentation in a commercial entertainment program. A film can be distributed as a feature film if it equals or exceeds a specified minimum running time and satisfies other defined criteria. The minimum time depends on the governing agency. The American Film Institute and the British Film Institute require films to have a minimum running time of forty minutes or longer. Other film agencies, e.g.,Screen Actors Guild, require a film's running time to be 60 minutes or greater. Currently, most feature films are between 70 and 210 minutes long.) were slowly becoming the standard fare for Hollywood producers. Before 1913, you could count the yearly features on two hands. Between 1915 and 1916, the number of feature movies rose 2 1/2 times or from 342 films to 835. There was a recurring claim that Carl Laemmle was the longest-running studio chief resisting the production of feature films. Universal was not ready to downsize its short film business because short films were cheaper, faster, and more profitable to produce than feature films. (Note: " Short Film" - There are no defined parameters for a Short film except for one immutable rule -the film's maximum running time. The Academy of Motion Picture Arts and Sciences defines a short film as "an original motion picture that has a running time of 40 minutes or less, including all credits".)

Laemmle would continue to buck this trend while slowly increasing his output of features. In 1914, Laemmle published an essay titled Doom of long Features Predicted. In 1916, Laemmle ran an advertisement extolling Bluebird films while adding the following vocabulary on the top of the ad. (Note: The moving picture business is here to stay. That you must admit, despite carping critics and blundering sore-heads, true, some exhibitors have found business so good lately — but if you get down to facts when you look for a reason why, it's a 100 to 1 shot that they are, and for some time have been, dallying with a feature program. Some of these wise ones will tell you that business has picked up since they went into features, — BUT — ask them whether they are talking NET or GROSS. They will find they have an immediate appointment and terminate your queries unceremoniously. Funny how we like to kid ourselves, isn't it? The man who is packing 'em in and losing money on features is envied by his competitor, who is laying by a bit every day, and has a good steady, dependable patronage but admits to a few vacant seats at some performances. When this chap wakes up, he will realize that he has a gold mine and that good advertising will make it produce to capacity. The moral is that if you can tie up to the Universal Program, DO IT. If you can't NOW, watch your first chance. Let the people know what you have, and let the feature man go on to ruin if he wants to. You should worry! Motion Picture News - May 6, 1916) Carl Laemmle released 91 feature-length films in 1916, as stated in Clive Hirschhorn's book, The Universal Story.

==== Development ====
This movie was initially planned as a two-reel morality play revolving around a central love theme. The film would feature Dorothy Davenport and Emory Johnson. Previously, the Davenport-Johnson pairing had appeared in five short films and two feature films. This film would become the eighth in the planned thirteen-film series featuring the pair.

Universal initially named this film "Not by Faith Alone." The film's story was adapted from an article by Rob Wagner in the Saturday Evening Post. Universal planned to showcase a love story set in the early days of Spanish-controlled California. The Spanish missions of San Gabriel and Santa Barbara would serve as a backdrop.

The movie gets its name from how the two main villains redeem themselves and leave their criminal past behind. As stated in the bible verse, their faith and deeds would be the basis for their judgment after they had moved on from their past crimes. The expectation was that the completed project would combine a moral message with an entertaining love story for moviegoers

==== Casting ====
- Dorothy Davenport (1895–1977) was an established star for Universal when the 21 year-old actress played Carmen. She had acted in hundreds of movies by the time she starred in this film. The majority of these films were 2-reel shorts, as was the norm in Hollywood's teen years. She had been making movies since 1910. She started dating Wally Reid when she was barely 16, and he was 20. They married in 1913. After her husband died in 1923, she used the name "Mrs. Wallace Reid" in the credits for any project she took part in. Besides being an actress, she would eventually become a film director, producer, and writer.
- Emory Johnson (1894–1960) was 22 years old when he starred in this movie as Jose Garcia. In January 1916, Emory signed a contract with Universal Film Manufacturing Company. Carl Laemmle of Universal Film Manufacturing Company thought he saw great potential in Johnson, so he chooses him to be Universal's new leading man. Laemmle's hope was Johnson would become another Wallace Reed. A major part of his plan was to create a movie couple that would sizzle on the silver screen. Laemmle thought Dorothy Davenport and Emory Johnson could create the chemistry he sought. Johnson and Davenport would complete 13 films together. They started with the successful feature production of Doctor Neighbor in May 1916 and ended with The Devil's Bondwoman in November 1916. After completing the last movie, Laemmle thought Johnson did not have the screen presence he wanted. He decided not to renew his contract. Johnson would make 17 movies in 1916, including eight shorts and 11 feature-length Dramas. 1916 would become the second-highest movie output of his entire acting career. Emory acted in 25 films for Universal, mostly dramas with a sprinkling of comedies and westerns.
- Alfred Allen (1866–1947) was 50 years old when he was selected to play Luis Lopez. Allen was highly educated, had a commanding presence and stood six feet, and weighed two hundred pounds. He got his start in the film industry at Universal city in 1913. He landed his first role in 1915. His roles were character parts, and he played mostly fathers, villains, or ranch owners. Alfred Allen appeared in 69 features from 1916 through 1929. After acting in Heartaches he would appear in four more Davenport-Johnson projects: A Yoke of Gold," The Unattainable, The Human Gamble and Barriers of Society.
- Richard Morris (1862–1924) was a 54 year-old actor when he played Padre Amador. He was a character actor and former opera singer known for Granny (1913). He would eventually participate in many Johnson projects, including |In the Name of the Law (1922), The Third Alarm (1922), The West~Bound Limited (1923), The Mailman (1923) until his untimely death in 1924.

==== Director ====
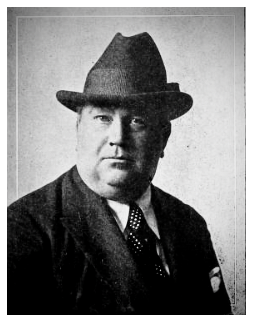
Director Lloyd B. Carleton

Lloyd B. Carleton (c. 1872–1933) started working for Carl Laemmle in the Fall of 1915. Carleton arrived with impeccable credentials, having directed some 60 films for the likes of Thanhouser, Lubin, Fox, and Selig.

Between March and December 1916, 44-year-old Lloyd Carleton directed 16 movies for Universal, starting with The Yaqui and ending with The Morals of Hilda. Emory Johnson acted in all 16 of these films. Of Carleton's total 1916 output, 11 were feature films, and the rest were two-reel shorts. After Emory Johnson signed his Universal contract in early 1916, Carl Laemmle, the owner of Universal Pictures, thought he had found a new leading man. Laemmle was looking for a male lead like Wallace Reid. He also wanted to develop a cinematic pair that would captivate audiences.

Johnson became Laemmle's choice for his new leading man. Laemmle chose Dorothy Davenport to spark screen chemistry with Johnson. She was a Universal contract player who was Wallace Reid's wife. Universal's top director, Lloyd B. Carleton, was tasked by Laemmle to direct all of this pair's films.

The collaboration of Johnson and Davenport resulted in 13 films, beginning with the release of Doctor Neighbor in May 1916. The last film in the series was The Devil's Bondwoman, released in November 1916. The majority of the movies were feature films. All the films featured Johnson and Davenport as the main stars.

Davenport became pregnant in October 1916, and her film output dropped sharply in early 1917. In the end, Laemmle felt Johnson was not talented nor charismatic enough. He would not be Universal's version of Wally Reid. Laemmle felt that the films needed more screen chemistry, even if they made money. In June 1918, Universal failed to renew the contract of Emory Johnson.

The table below lists the 13 films Johnson and Davenport collaborated on.

◆ Films starring Emory Johnson and Dorothy Davenport in 1916 ◆
Title	Released	Director	Davenport role	Johnson role	Type	Time	LOC	Brand	Notes
Doctor Neighbor	1 May	Carleton	Hazel Rogers	Hamilton Powers	Drama	Feature	lost	Red Feather	
Her Husband's Faith	11 May	Carleton	Mabel Otto	Richard Otto	Drama	Short	lost	Universal	
Heartaches	18 May	Carleton	Virginia Payne	S Jackson Hunt	Drama	Short	lost	Universal	
Two Mothers	1 Jun	Carleton	Violetta Andree	2nd Husband	Drama	Short	lost	Universal	
Her Soul's Song	15 Jun	Carleton	Mary Salsbury	Paul Chandos	Drama	Short	lost	Universal	
The Way of the World	3 Jul	Carleton	Beatrice Farley	Walter Croyden	Drama	Feature	lost	Red Feather	
No. 16 Martin Street	13 Jul	Carleton	Cleo	Jacques Fournier	Drama	Short	lost	Universal	
A Yoke of Gold	14 Aug	Carleton	Carmen	Jose Garcia	Drama	Feature	lost	Red Feather	
The Unattainable	4 Sep	Carleton	Bessie Gale	Robert Goodman	Drama	Feature	1 of 5 reels	Bluebird	
Black Friday	18 Sep	Carleton	Elionor Rossitor	Charles Dalton	Drama	Feature	lost	Red Feather	
The Human Gamble	8 Oct	Carleton	Flavia Hill	Charles Hill	Drama	Short	lost	Universal	
Barriers of Society	10 Oct	Carleton	Martha Gorham	Westie Phillips	Drama	Feature	1 of 5 reels	Red Feather	
The Devil's Bondwoman	11 Nov	Carleton	Beverly Hope	Mason Van Horton	Drama	Feature	lost	Red Feather	

==== Screenplay ====
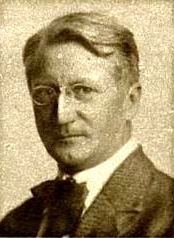
Rob Wagner
1921

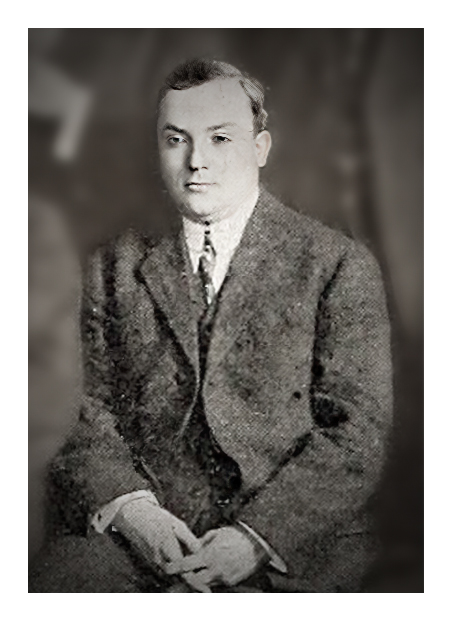
CalderJohnstone
1912

Robert Leicester Wagner (1872 - 1942), better known as Rob (Bob) Wagner, was born In Detroit, Michigan on August 2, 1872. In 1914, Wagner married a newspaperwoman who believed he could earn more money writing about the film industry than as a working artist. Between 1915 and 1918, he wrote a series of articles on the film industry for the Saturday Evening Post. This story was based on one of those articles. During his career, Wagner would demonstrate his talents as an artist, magazine writer, screenwriter, and director. He was 44 years old when this film was released.

The screenplay was created by Calder Johnstone (1880–1958), who began writing scenarios in 1914. This film was released when Johnstone was 36 years old and a member of the Universal writing staff. He had previously written scenarios for Two Mothers and Her Soul's Song, both released earlier in the year. After completing this film's scenario, he would write the story and adaptation for the October 1916 Universal production of The Human Gamble.

=== Filming ===
==== Exteriors ====
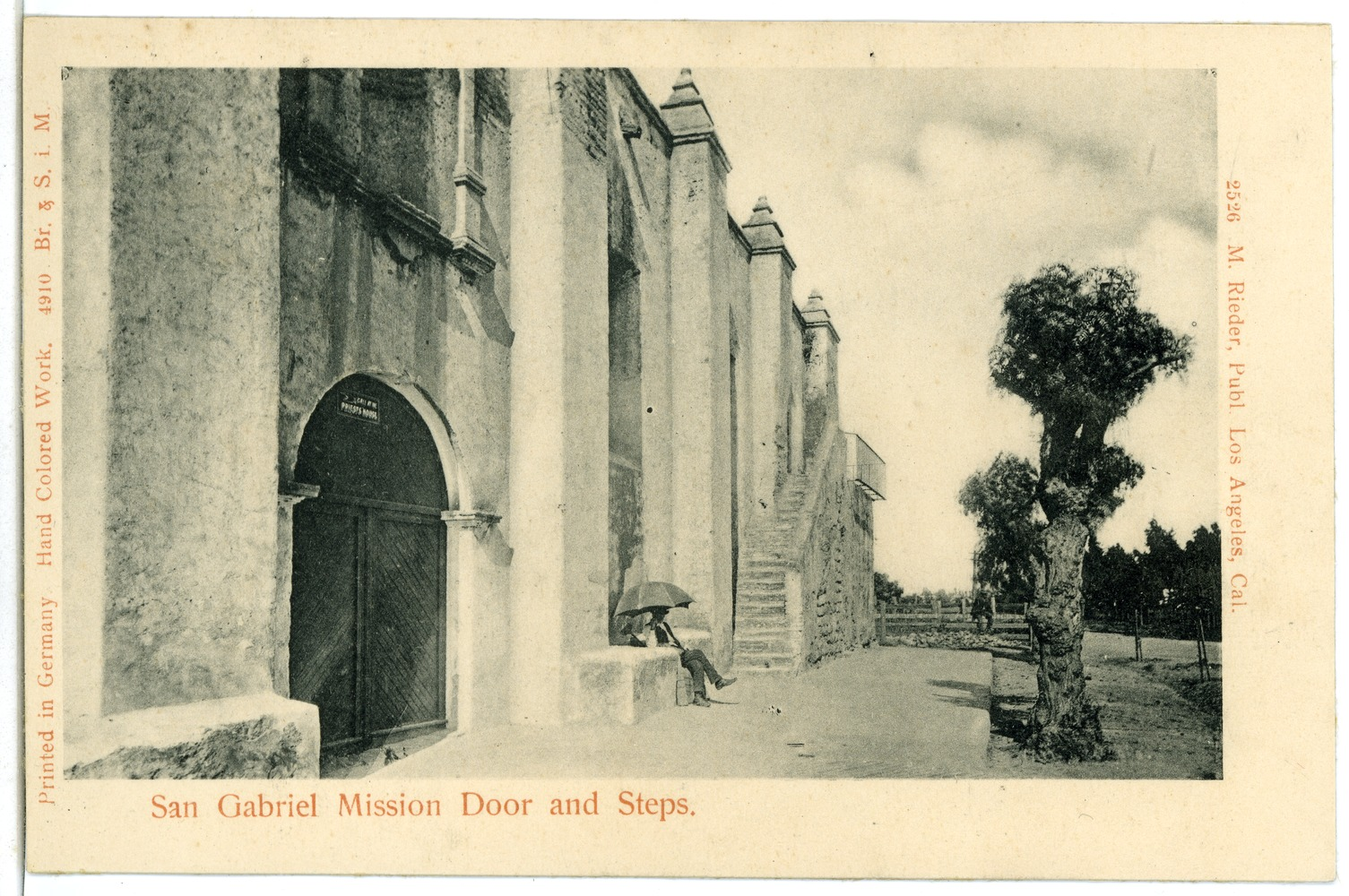
Mission San Gabriel

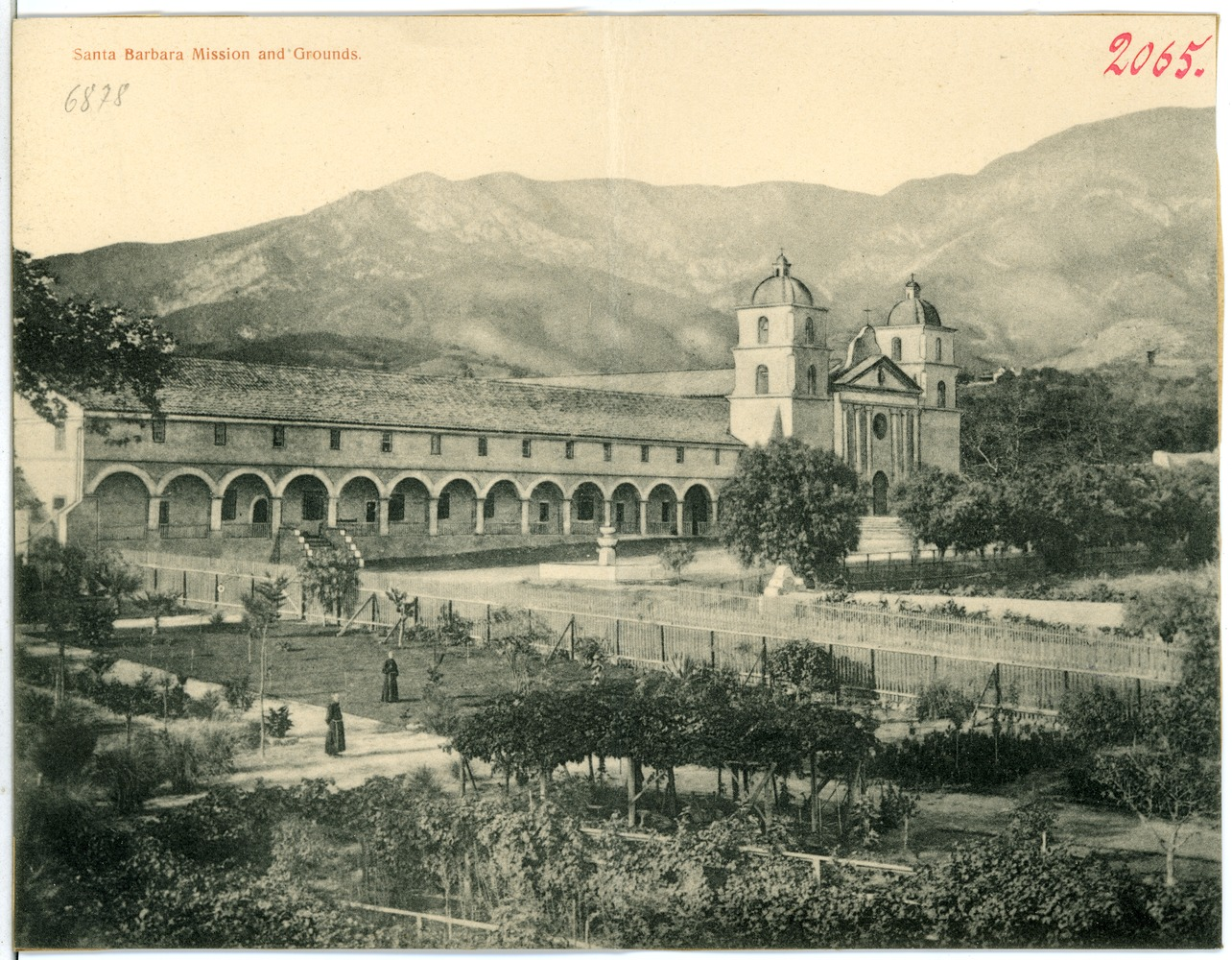
Mission Santa Barbara

There are twenty-one religious outposts or missions located in California. Rob Wagner's original story in the Saturday Evening Post mentioned two missions. Director Lloyd B. Carleton chose these two missions for his picture. Several motion picture magazines sources verify the area of location shooting for this project. (Note: The following snippets are trade journal entries suggesting the locations for filming: "It is a story of the early mission days in southern California, and the scenes will be made on the exact locations described in the story."; "Several of the old missions of California are used as settings for scenes in this, the story dealing with the effect of the mission fathers on desperate marauders."; "This is a story of old California days, located in San Gabriel and Santa Barbara missions and the surrounding country."; "Of old California days, located in San Gabriel and Santa Barbara missions and the surrounding country."; "Jose Gracia satisfied to live out his life in the drowsy peace of old San Gabriel."; "Jose is induced to travel from San Gabriel to Santa Barbara . . .")

The mission of San Gabriel was a fortuitous choice because it was only twenty miles from Hollywood. The mission was founded in 1771 and named in honor of the Archangel Gabriel. The mission earned the nickname "Godmother of the Pueblo of Los Angeles" due to its significance.

The second choice was the "Queen of the Missions" in Santa Barbara, California. The mission at Santa Barbara was established in 1786 and is 120 miles from San Gabriel. The Royal Road is home to both missions. In addition, the San Gabriel Mountains and the Mojave Desert served as the settings for other essential scenes in the movie.

==== Interiors ====
On March 15, 1915, Laemmle opened the world's largest motion picture production facility, Universal City Studios. It is unclear if this movie filmed any interiors at Universal city.

==== Schedule ====
According to a news item published in the Los Angeles Sunday Times, location shooting for this film started in April 1916. An item in the May 27, 1916 issue in the Motion Picture News referred to the film as a two-reel photoplay named " 'Not by Faith Alone,' or 'In the Days of the Missions,' .

On June 3, 1916, a notice in the Motion Picture News stated: "The scenario entitled 'Not by Faith Alone' adopted from the Bob Wagner story of the same name is to be made into five reels instead of two as first planned." In the June 17, 1916 issue of Motography, an article reported that Lloyd Carleton had completed a two-reel drama called "The Days of the Missions." (Title is not a misprint) The exact date of the film's final name change to "A Yoke of Gold" is unknown.

Apart from altering the title and length, the movie transitioned from a moral story to a historical depiction, ultimately focusing on the clash between the wealthy California elite and those aiming to rob their wealth.

==== Working title ====
During the production of films, a project must have a way to be referenced. The project is given a working title. An Alternate title is another term for a Working Title. Frequently, the working title turns into the release title. There were several titles for this film, but none were officially recognized as a working title.

- Originally titled "Not by Faith Alone," this film began as a two-reel film.
- The title was changed to "In the Days of the Missions."
- Next, we notice that the "In" is omitted - "The Days of the Missions."
- The Copyright application for A YOKE OF GOLD; or, IN THE DAYS OF THE MISSIONS. is submitted on July 17.
- Movie critics start referring to the film as - "The Yoke of Gold."
- Finally, we arrive at A Yoke of Gold.

=== Post production ===
==== Music ====
As part of Universal's in-house publication, The Moving Picture Weekly, a section was devoted to proposing musical selections for specific Universal movies. The musical selections were "Specially Selected and Compiled by M. Winkler." Each reel of the movie had recommendations, as shown below:

A Yoke of Gold
Mexican Kisses by Charles Roberts is the theme.
REEL I.
1. "Maximilian Overture" by Ascher until "After the simple repast."
2. "Lola" is a Mexican love song by Tobani until "The following day."
3. "Jovitta" Mexican Serenade until "When the sun rose, they started," etc.
4. "Habanera" from "Carmen" by Bizet.

The complete music recommendations for this film are located in the Gallery section of this page.

== Release and reception ==
=== Official release ===
The copyright was filed with U.S. Copyright Office on June 17, 1916. and entered into the record as shown: (Note: The copyright was filed with U.S. Copyright Office and entered into the record as shown. A YOKE OF GOLD; or, IN THE DAYS OF THE MISSIONS. Red Feather. 1916. 5 reels Credits: Director, Lloyd B. Carleton; story, Bob Wagner; scenario, Calder Johnstone. © Universal Film Mfg. Co., Inc.; 17Jul16; LP8723)

In 1916, "Red Feather" movies were always released on Mondays. This film was officially released on Monday, August 14, 1916.

=== Advertising ===
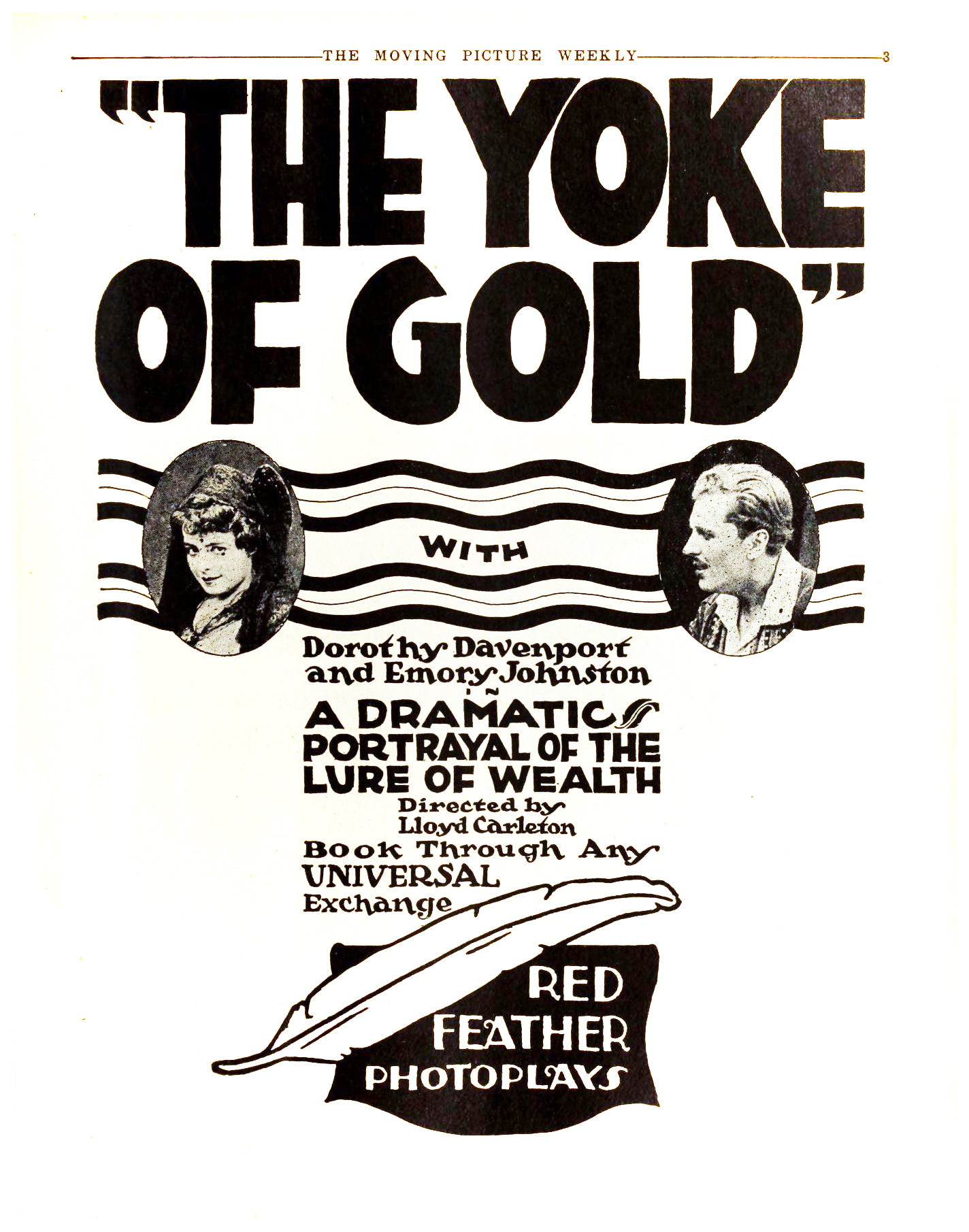
Moving Picture Weekly Movie Ad

In 1916, Universal became the first Hollywood studio to classify feature films based on production cost. One of the reasons behind this move was that the "Big Five" film studios owned their own movie houses, enabling them to have guaranteed outlets for their entertainment products. Unlike the majors, Universal did not own any theaters or theater chains. Branding all Universal-produced feature films would give theater owners another tool to judge the films they were about to lease and help fans decide which movies they wanted to see. (Note: Universal formed a three-tier branding system for their feature films based on the size of their budget and status. In the book "The Universal Story," the author Clive Hirschhorn describes the feature movie branding as: Red Feather Photoplays – low-budget feature films; Bluebird Photoplays – mainstream feature release and more ambitious productions; Jewel – prestige motion pictures featuring high budgets using prominent actors; In 1917, the Butterfly line, a grade between Red Feather and Bluebird, was introduced. During the following two years, half of Universal's feature film output was in the Red Feather and Butterfly categories. However, this was during a time when stars increasingly took the spotlight in advertising. The branding tags seemly ignored that the ticket-buying audience attended movies to see their favorite stars, not the vehicle allowing them to perform.)

In 1916, Universal produced 91 branded feature films, consisting of 44 Bluebirds and 47 Red Feather productions. The branding system had a brief existence and, by 1920, had faded away.

=== Reviews ===
Melodrama films have plots appealing to the raised passions of the audience. They concentrate on family issues, direct their attention to a victim character, and develop the themes of duty and love. The melodramatic format shows the characters working through their struggles with persistence, sacrificial deeds, and courage.

The critics generally panned this movie.

In the September 16, 1916 issue of the New York Clipper, the reviewer writes

Here we have the "Red Feather" stuff at what seems to be its lowest ebb . . . The story is weak, the direction fair at best, the acting "most ordinary", and the general characteristics, designate "The Yoke of Gold" as a puerile affair.

In the September issue of the Moving Picture World, Robert C. McElravy reviewed this movie and stated:

A weak story is its main drawback, and this is the more noticeable because so many strong tales have been woven about the early days of California. . . . There is a great deal of quiet beauty in these offerings and a strong moral purpose in the story. But these things do not compensate for the slow action and lack of dramatic strength

In the September issue of the Motion Picture News, Peter Milne was more upbeat in his review. He observed:

Aided by some beautiful scenes and good photography, the picture leaves little to be desired from an artistic standpoint . . . With Emory Johnson and Dorothy Davenport in the roles of lovers and Alfred Allen as the bandit, the picture has been well-acted.

=== Box office ===
The September issue of the New York Clipper estimated the budget of this film at no more than US$3,000 (equivalent to $88,761 in 2025). They used this figure to explain the poor quality of the feature film. They also pointed out "...the big feature companies are to-day spending from US$5,000 (equivalent to $147,936 in 2025) to US$20,000 (equivalent to $591,743 in 2025) on a five-reeler.

== Preservation status ==
Many silent-era films did not survive for reasons as explained on this Wikipedia page. (Note: Film is history. With every foot of film lost, we lose a link to our culture, the world around us, each other, and ourselves. – Martin Scorsese, filmmaker, director NFPF Board A report by Library of Congress film historian and archivist David Pierce estimates that: around 75% of original silent-era films have perished; 14% of the 10,919 silent films released by major studios exist in their original 35 mm or other formats; 11% survive only in full-length foreign versions or film formats of lesser image quality.) According to the Library of Congress, all known copies of this film are lost.

== Gallery ==
=== The Players ===
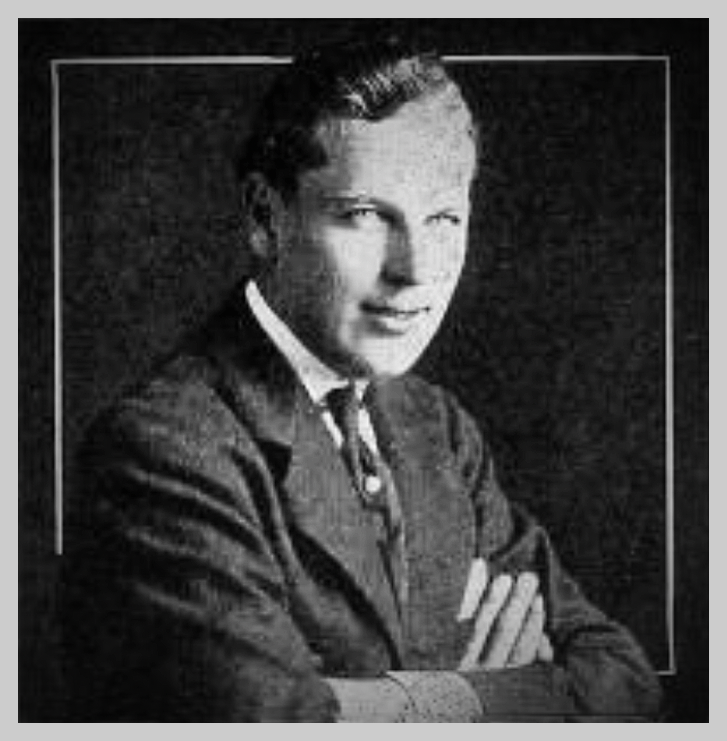
Emory Johnson
1916

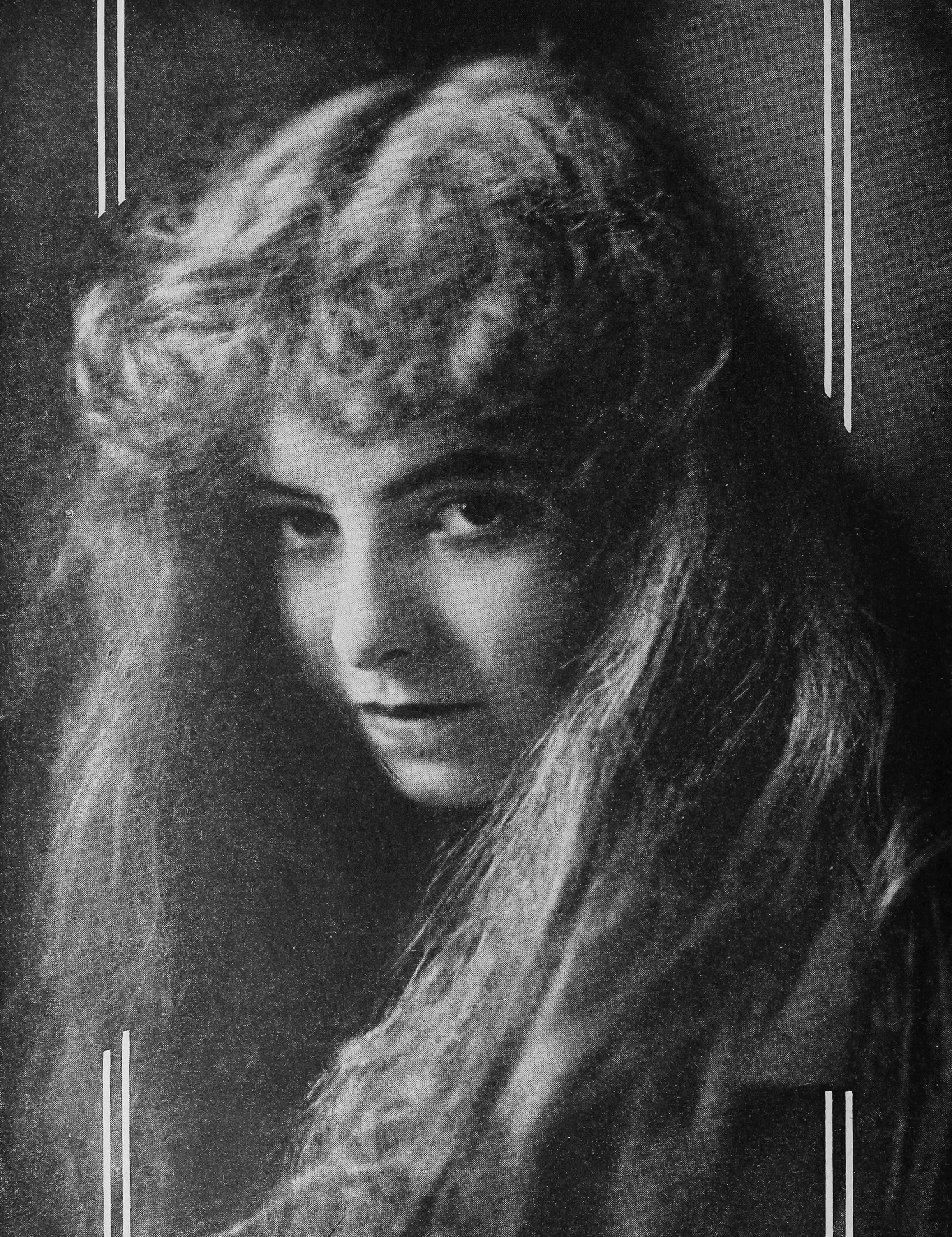
Dorothy Davenport
1914

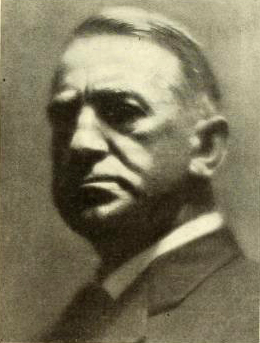
Alfred Allen
1919

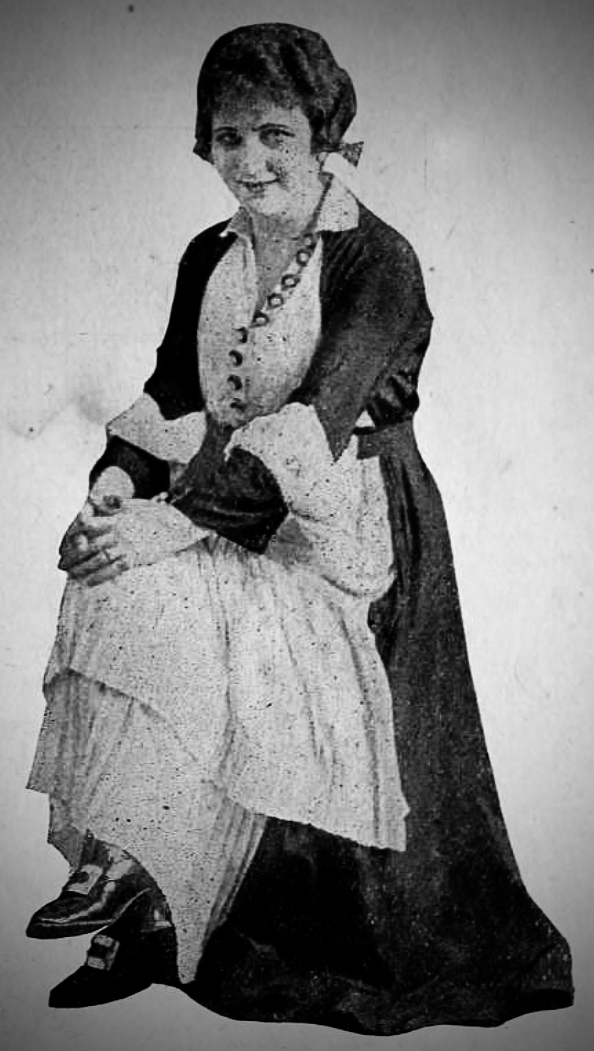
Gretchen Lederer
1916

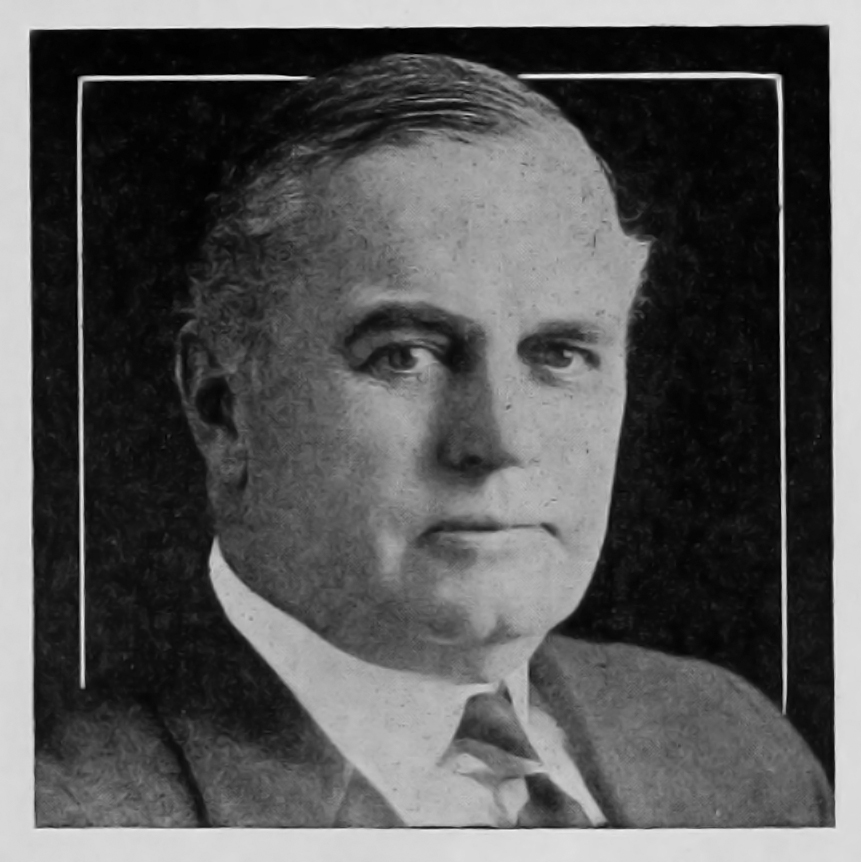
Richard Morris
1916

=== Stills from the motion picture ===
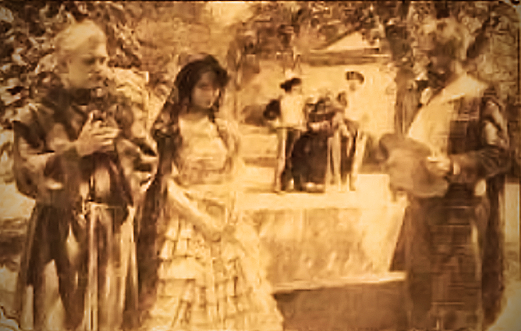
The Mission background
of the film

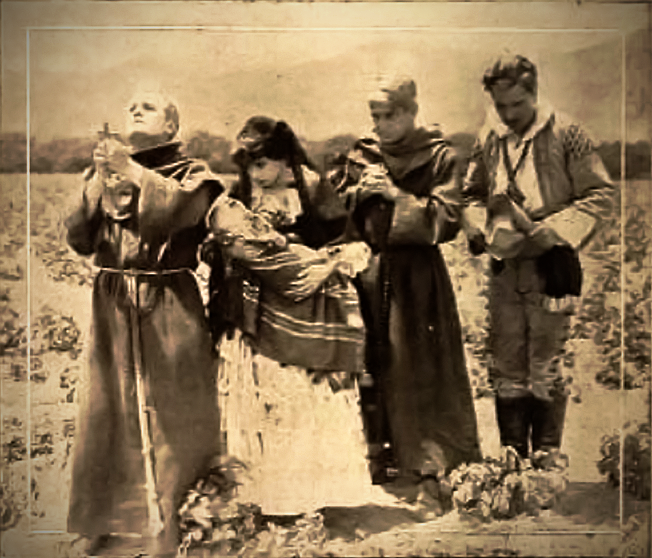
Jose and Carmen
receive Padre's blessing.

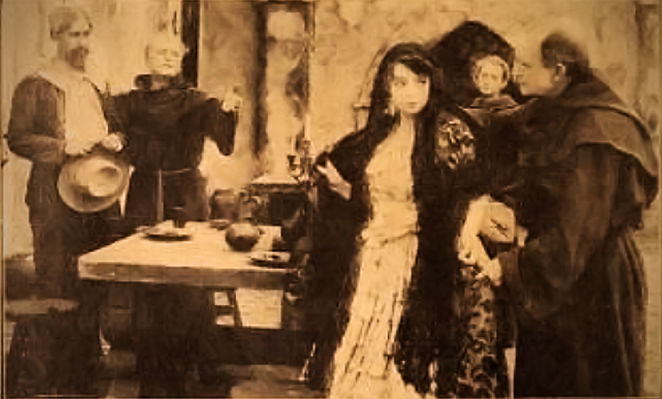
Carmen rests at Santa Barbara.

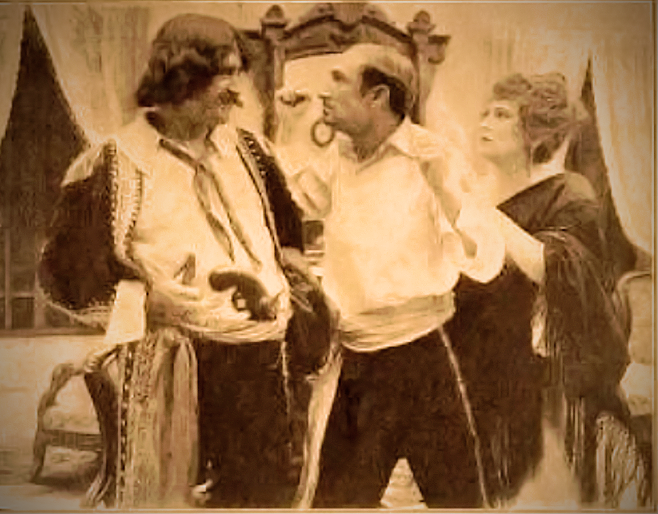
Mendoza and wife
confront Lopez

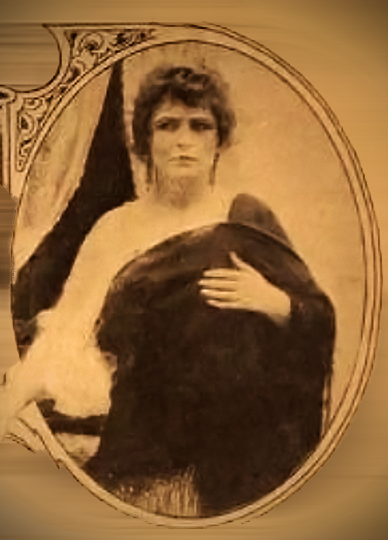
Gretchen Lederer
Mrs. Mendoza

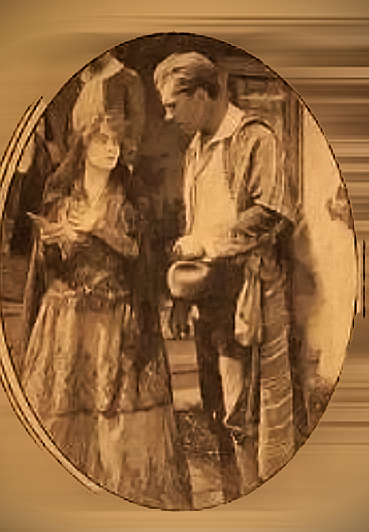
Dorothy Davenport
Emory Johnson

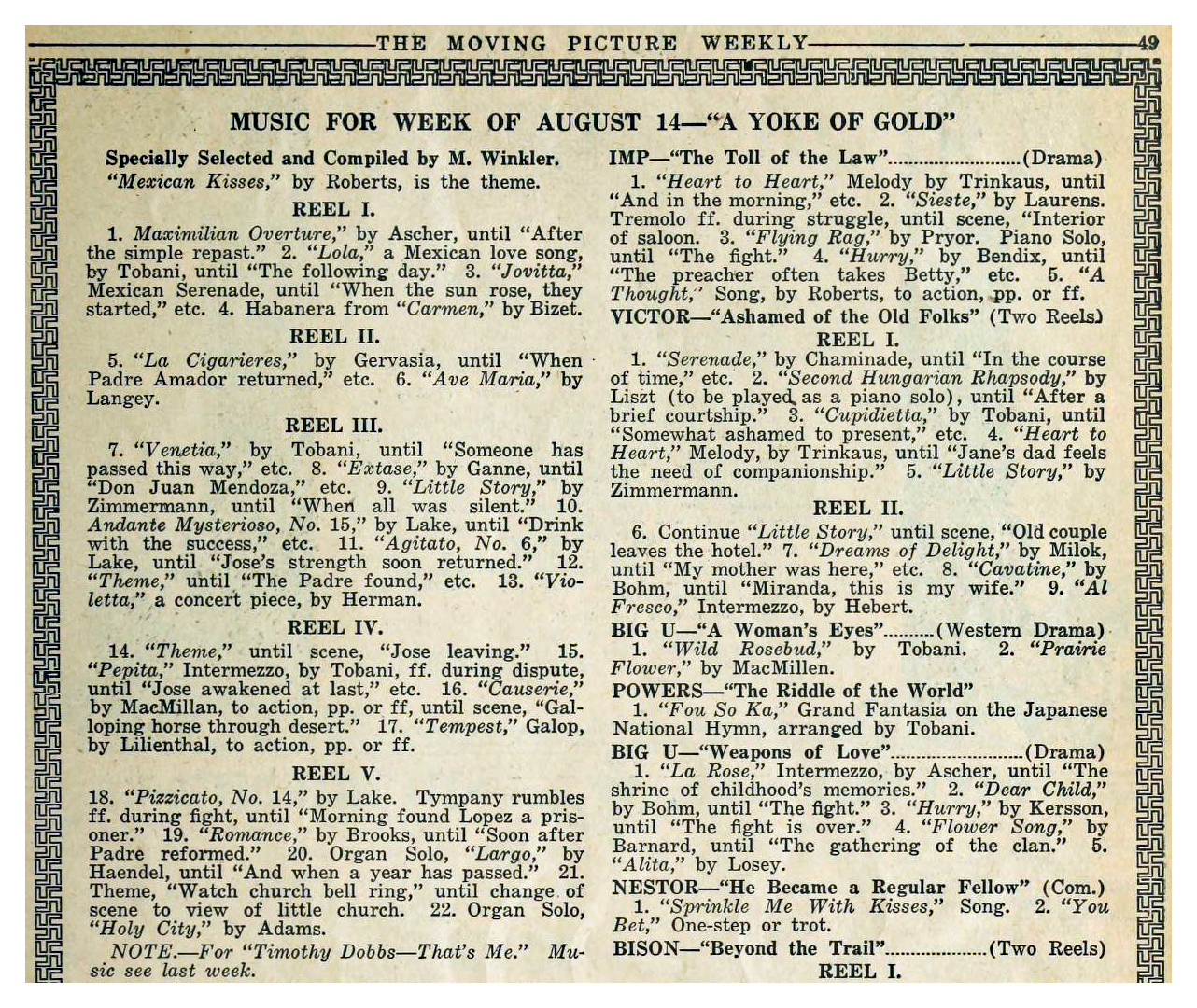
Music Suggestions

== Sources ==
- Braff, R.E. (1999). The Universal Silents: A Filmography of the Universal Motion Picture Manufacturing Company, 1912-1929. McFarland. ISBN 978-0-7864-0287-8.
- Fleming, E.J. (2010). Wallace Reid: The Life and Death of a Hollywood Idol. McFarland. ISBN 978-0-7864-8266-5.
- Hirschhorn, Clive (1983). The Universal Story - The Complete History of the Studio and its 2,641 films. New York: Crown Publishing Group. pp. 22–23. ISBN 0-517-55001-6.
- Keil, C.; Stamp, S. (2004). American Cinema's Transitional Era: Audiences, Institutions, Practices. ACLS Humanities E-Book. University of California Press. ISBN 978-0-520-24027-8.
