= Two Mothers (1916 film) =

1916 movie by Lloyd B. Carleton

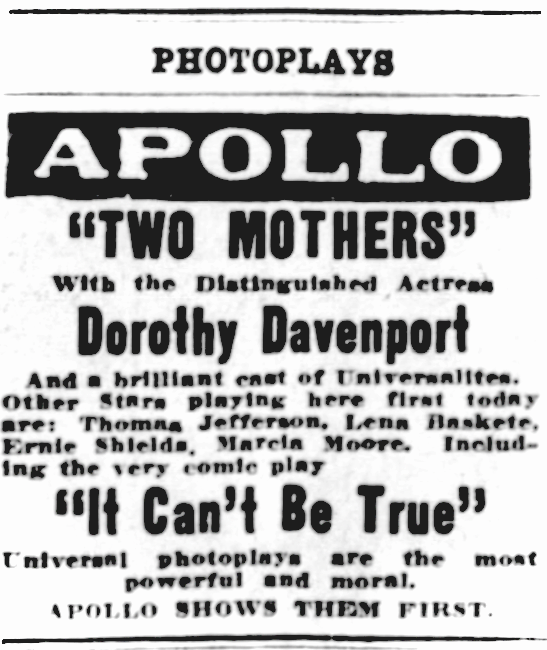
- Theater Ad for Two Mothers
- Directed by: Lloyd B. Carleton
- Written by: I.A.R. Wylie
- Screenplay by: Calder Johnstone
- Produced by: Carl Laemmle
- Starring: Dorothy Davenport; Emory Johnson
- Production company: Universal
- Distributed by: Universal
- Release date: June 1, 1916
- Running time: 15–24 minutes (2 reels)
- Country: United States
- Languages: Silent film English intertitles

Two Mothers is a 1916 American silent short film directed by Lloyd B. Carleton. The film is based on a story by I.A.R. Wylie. Calder Johnstone developed the adaptation for the screen. The drama's features Dorothy Davenport, Alfred Allen and Emory Johnson.

Nina Angus is an opera singer. She is the lone support for a disabled husband and a 12-year-old boy. The leading part in a famous opera opens up for auditions. Nina is one of two finalists for the role. Her competition is a well-known singer who is the ex-wife of her husband. Conflicting background stories emerge stirring up deep emotions in both women, but they resolve their issues to make for a happy ending.

The film was released on June 1, 1916, by Universal.

== Plot ==
The Grand Opera house has staged a production of Carmen. They have yet to select a Prima Donna for the role of the gypsy girl, Carmen. The leading role has called out for auditions. When the tryouts finish, only two women remain Nine Angus and Violetta Andree.

Some years ago, Nina Angus married Richard Angus. Nina's husband had a son from a previous marriage, Richard (Dick) Angus Jr., and the couple has raised the 12-year-old boy as their own. Richard has a disability, and Nina provides the sole support for the family. Their finances have taken a turn for the worse, and the family depends on Nina securing this job. Recently, Nina has struggled to find work. Nina returns home to relax after experiencing another grueling day of auditions. The family has dinner together, and after Dick goes to bed, Nina has a serious talk with her husband. Nina mentions she only has one serious rival she must outperform. The problem, Nina admits, is her competition is more accomplished and can sing better than she. She explains her rival's name to be none other than Violetta Andree, the ex-wife of Richard and Dick's birth mother. Violetta is a local favorite in town, and her engagement book is seldom empty.

Richard reveals to Nina the reason he and Violetta divorced so many years ago. He tells Nina that Violetta was a flirt and always in the company of men. He said in the end; she had abandoned him, her home, and her child. Richard had no choice but to seek a divorce. Nina believed Richard's story, and the two commiserated together. Richard retires early. Later that evening, there is a knock on the door, and when Nina opens the door, Violetta is standing on the porch. She wants to talk about her 12-year-old son.

Violetta feels now that she is successful, she would like to gain full guardianship of her son. Knowing Nina and the family are financially strapped, she offers many inducements. Violetta finally offers to feint illness, thus giving the part of Carmen to Nina if she will give up custody of the boy. Nina still trusts her husband's description of Violetta's home-wrecking past. She refuses! Nina tells Violetta, she is the only mother Richard Jr. has ever known. She couldn't give him up now, especially with Violetta's history.

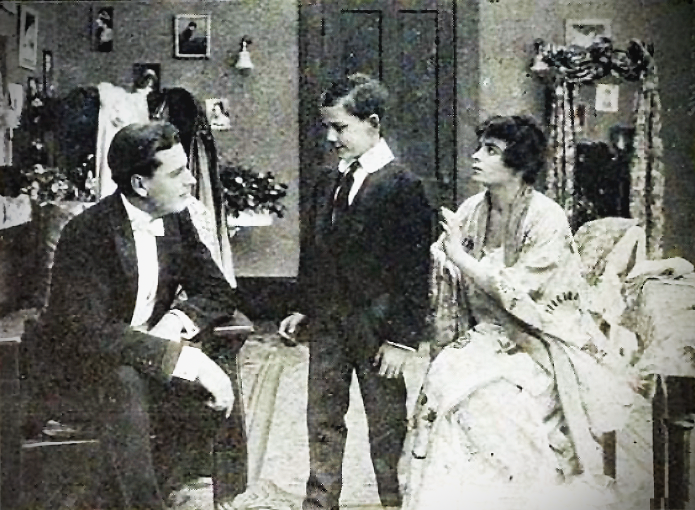
Dick talks to his step-father

Violetta seems puzzled when Nina explained her reasoning for maintaining custody. She asks what Richard Sr. had told Nina of their previous circumstances. Now we find out the other side of the story. Violetta claims Richard Sr. was a heavy drinker, and she supported him for years. Then she met a man who sympathized with her plight, and they became fast friends. Richard Sr. became insanely jealous of their friendship and the man's wealth. He demanded a divorce. She sacrificed everything, including her son, to marry her current husband and continue her career.

Nina pondered over the sacrifices she had made, supporting her disabled husband and taking care of her stepson. She further reflected on the wrong influence she thought the boy's birth mother would have on him before discovering the actual truth. Nina has life-changing choices before her. The following evening, Violetta is sitting in her dressing room. A call-boy stops in and hands her a card. The card is a request from Mr. Richard Angus stating he would like to see her before the show's start. She tells the call-boy to escort him in.

A 12-year-old boy walks into her dressing room wearing a well-used evening suit. It occurred to Violetta that Mr. Richard Angus might be Mr. Richard Angus Jr., her son. Dick pleads with Violetta to let his mom have the part of Carmen. The young man knows his family is suffering and how desperately his mother needs this job. They chat awhile longer, and Dick tells Violetta that Nina became his step-mom when his birth mother had died. Dick reaches in his pocket and pulls out an old worn photograph. The picture is of Dick and a very young woman–Violetta. Violetta understands Dick does not know that she is his birth mother. Emotions overcome Violetta and she kisses the young man on the forehead. She decides for the sake of the boy, she will not disclose her true identity.

Violetta asks Dick to return to his mother, and she will see what she can do to help. After the boy leaves, she calls her husband. She says he must develop a means to support the Angus family financially. He agrees to do so. Then she calls the manager and notifies him she is too ill to perform. She suggests the manager call Nina Angus.

== Cast ==
Actor	Role
Dorothy Davenport	Violetta Andree
Emory Johnson	Violetta's Second Husband
Alfred Allen	Richard Angus
Gordon Griffith	Dick Angus, the son of Richard
Virginia Southern	Nina Angus

== Production ==
=== Pre production ===
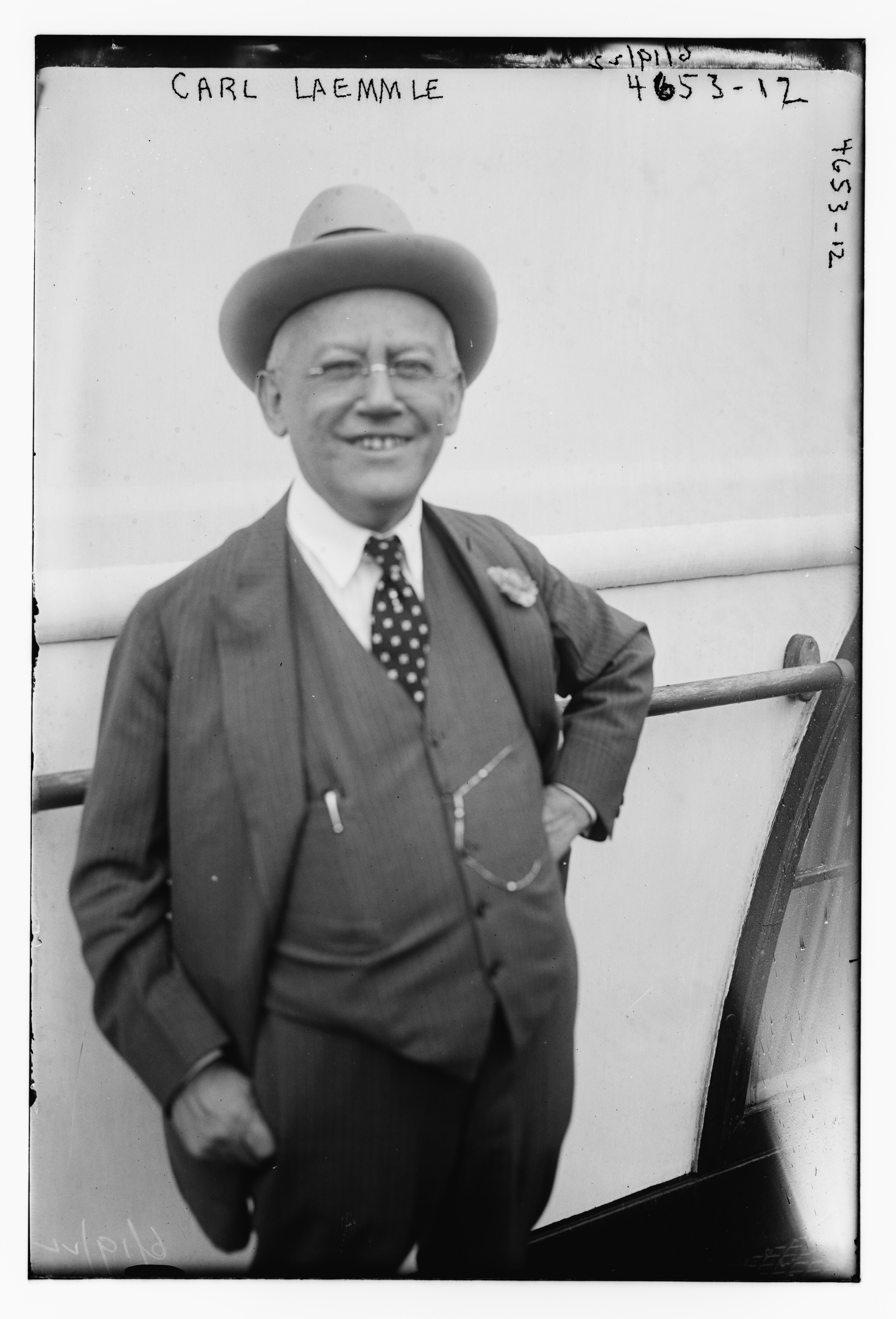
Carl Laemmle in 1918

Universal Logo 1915

In the book, "American Cinema's Transitional Era," the authors point out, The years between 1908 and 1917 witnessed what may have been the most significant transformation in American film history. During this "transitional era," widespread changes affected film form and film genres, filmmaking practices and industry structure, exhibition sites, and audience demographics. One aspect of this transition was the longer duration of films. Feature films (Note: A "feature film" or "feature-length film" is a narrative film (motion picture or "movie") with a running time long enough to be considered the principal or sole presentation in a commercial entertainment program. A film can be distributed as a feature film if it equals or exceeds a specified minimum running time and satisfies other defined criteria. The minimum time depends on the governing agency. The American Film Institute and the British Film Institute require films to have a minimum running time of forty minutes or longer. Other film agencies, e.g.,Screen Actors Guild, require a film's running time to be 60 minutes or greater. Currently, most feature films are between 70 and 210 minutes long.) were slowly becoming the standard fare for Hollywood producers. Before 1913, you could count the yearly features on two hands. Between 1915 and 1916, the number of feature movies rose 2 ½ times or from 342 films to 835. There was a recurring claim that Carl Laemmle was the longest-running studio chief resisting the production of feature films. Universal was not ready to downsize its short film business because short films were cheaper, faster, and more profitable to produce than feature films. (Note: " Short Film" - There are no defined parameters for a Short film except for one immutable rule -the film's maximum running time. The Academy of Motion Picture Arts and Sciences defines a short film as "an original motion picture that has a running time of 40 minutes or less, including all credits".)

Laemmle would continue to buck this trend while slowly increasing his output of features. In 1914, Laemmle published an essay titled - Doom of long Features Predicted. In 1915, Laemmle ran an advertisement extolling Bluebird films while adding the following vocabulary on the top of the ad. (Note: The moving picture business is here to stay. That you must admit, despite carping critics and blundering sore-heads, true, some exhibitors have found business so good lately — but if you get down to facts when you look for a reason why, it's a 100 to 1 shot that they are, and for some time have been, dallying with a feature program. Some of these wise ones will tell you that business has picked up since they went into features, — BUT — ask them whether they are talking NET or GROSS. They will find they have an immediate appointment and terminate your queries unceremoniously. Funny how we like to kid ourselves, isn't it? The man who is packing 'em in and losing money on features is envied by his competitor, who is laying by a bit every day, and has a good steady, dependable patronage but admits to a few vacant seats at some performances. When this chap wakes up, he will realize that he has a gold mine and that good advertising will make it produce to capacity. The moral is that if you can tie up to the Universal Program, DO IT. If you can't NOW, watch your first chance. Let the people know what you have, and let the feature man go on to ruin if he wants to. You should worry! Motion Picture News - May 6, 1916) Carl Laemmle released 100 feature-length films in 1916, as stated in Clive Hirschhorn's book, The Universal Story.

==== Casting ====
- Dorothy Davenport (1895–1977) was an established star for Universal when the 21 year-old actress played Violetta Andree. She had acted in hundreds of movies by the time she starred in this film. The majority of these films were 2-reel shorts, as was the norm in Hollywood's teen years. She had been making movies since 1910. She started dating Wally Reid when she was barely 16, and he was 20. They married in 1913. After her husband died in 1923, she used the name "Mrs. Wallace Reid" in the credits for any project she took part in. Besides being an actress, she would eventually become a film director, producer, and writer.
- Emory Johnson (1894–1960) was 22 years old when he acted in this movie as Violetta's Second Husband. In January 1916, Emory signed a contract with Universal Film Manufacturing Company. Carl Laemmle of Universal Film Manufacturing Company thought he saw great potential in Johnson, so he chooses him to be Universal's new leading man. Laemmle's hope was Johnson would become another Wallace Reed. A major part of his plan was to create a movie couple that would sizzle on the silver screen. Laemmle thought Dorothy Davenport and Emory Johnson could create the chemistry he sought. Johnson and Davenport would complete 13 films together. They started with the successful feature production of Doctor Neighbor in May 1916 and ended with The Devil's Bondwoman in November 1916. After completing the last movie, Laemmle thought Johnson did not have the screen presence he wanted. He decided not to renew his contract. Johnson would make 17 movies in 1916, including 6 shorts and 11 feature-length Dramas. 1916 would become the second-highest movie output of his entire acting career. Emory acted in 25 films for Universal, mostly dramas with a sprinkling of comedies and westerns.
- Alfred Allen (1866–1947) was 50 years old when he was selected to play Richard Angus. Allen was highly educated, had a commanding presence and stood six feet, and weighed two hundred pounds. He got his start in the film industry at Universal city in 1913. He landed his first role in 1915. His roles were character parts, and he played mostly fathers, villains, or ranch owners. Alfred Allen appeared in 69 features from 1916 through 1929. After heartaches he would appear in four more Davenport-Johnson projects: A Yoke of Gold, The Unattainable, The Human Gamble and Barriers of Society.
- Gordon Griffith (1907–1958) was 8 years old when he played the role of a 12-year-old boy named Richard (Dick) Angus. He was one of the first child actors in the American movie industry. He was already an experienced actor by the age of seven. He was born on July 4, 1907, in Chicago, Illinois.

==== Director ====
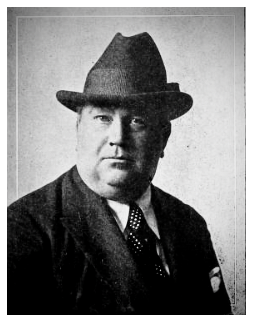
Director Lloyd B. Carleton

Lloyd B. Carleton (c. 1872–1933) started working for Carl Laemmle in the Fall of 1915. Carleton arrived with impeccable credentials, having directed some 60 films for the likes of Thanhouser, Lubin, Fox, and Selig.

Between March and December 1916, 44-year-old Lloyd Carleton directed 16 movies for Universal, starting with The Yaqui and ending with The Morals of Hilda released on December 11, 1916.. Emory Johnson acted in all 16 of these films. Of Carleton's total 1916 output, 11 were feature films, and the rest were two-reel shorts. After Emory Johnson signed his Universal contract in early 1916, Carl Laemmle, the owner of Universal Pictures, thought he had found a new leading man. Laemmle was looking for a male lead like Wallace Reid. He also wanted to develop a cinematic pair that would captivate audiences.

Johnson became Laemmle's choice for his new leading man. Laemmle chose Dorothy Davenport to spark screen chemistry with Johnson. She was a Universal contract player who was Wallace Reid's wife. Universal's top director, Lloyd B. Carleton, was tasked by Laemmle to direct all of this pair's films.

The collaboration of Johnson and Davenport resulted in 13 films, beginning with the release of Doctor Neighbor in May 1916. The last film in the series was The Devil's Bondwoman, released in November 1916. The majority of the movies were feature films. All the films featured Johnson and Davenport as the main stars.

Davenport became pregnant in October 1916, and her film output dropped sharply in early 1917. In the end, Laemmle felt Johnson was not talented nor charismatic enough. He would not be Universal's version of Wally Reid. Laemmle felt that the films needed more screen chemistry, even if they made money. In June 1918, Universal failed to renew the contract of Emory Johnson.

The table below lists the 13 films Johnson and Davenport collaborated on.

◆ Films starring Emory Johnson and Dorothy Davenport in 1916 ◆
Title	Released	Director	Davenport role	Johnson role	Type	Time	LOC	Brand	Notes
Doctor Neighbor	1 May	Carleton	Hazel Rogers	Hamilton Powers	Drama	Feature	lost	Red Feather	
Her Husband's Faith	11 May	Carleton	Mabel Otto	Richard Otto	Drama	Short	lost	Universal	
Heartaches	18 May	Carleton	Virginia Payne	S Jackson Hunt	Drama	Short	lost	Universal	
Two Mothers	1 Jun	Carleton	Violetta Andree	2nd Husband	Drama	Short	lost	Universal	
Her Soul's Song	15 Jun	Carleton	Mary Salsbury	Paul Chandos	Drama	Short	lost	Universal	
The Way of the World	3 Jul	Carleton	Beatrice Farley	Walter Croyden	Drama	Feature	lost	Red Feather	
No. 16 Martin Street	13 Jul	Carleton	Cleo	Jacques Fournier	Drama	Short	lost	Universal	
A Yoke of Gold	14 Aug	Carleton	Carmen	Jose Garcia	Drama	Feature	lost	Red Feather	
The Unattainable	4 Sep	Carleton	Bessie Gale	Robert Goodman	Drama	Feature	1 of 5 reels	Bluebird	
Black Friday	18 Sep	Carleton	Elionor Rossitor	Charles Dalton	Drama	Feature	lost	Red Feather	
The Human Gamble	8 Oct	Carleton	Flavia Hill	Charles Hill	Drama	Short	lost	Universal	
Barriers of Society	10 Oct	Carleton	Martha Gorham	Westie Phillips	Drama	Feature	1 of 5 reels	Red Feather	
The Devil's Bondwoman	11 Nov	Carleton	Beverly Hope	Mason Van Horton	Drama	Feature	lost	Red Feather	

==== Screenplay ====
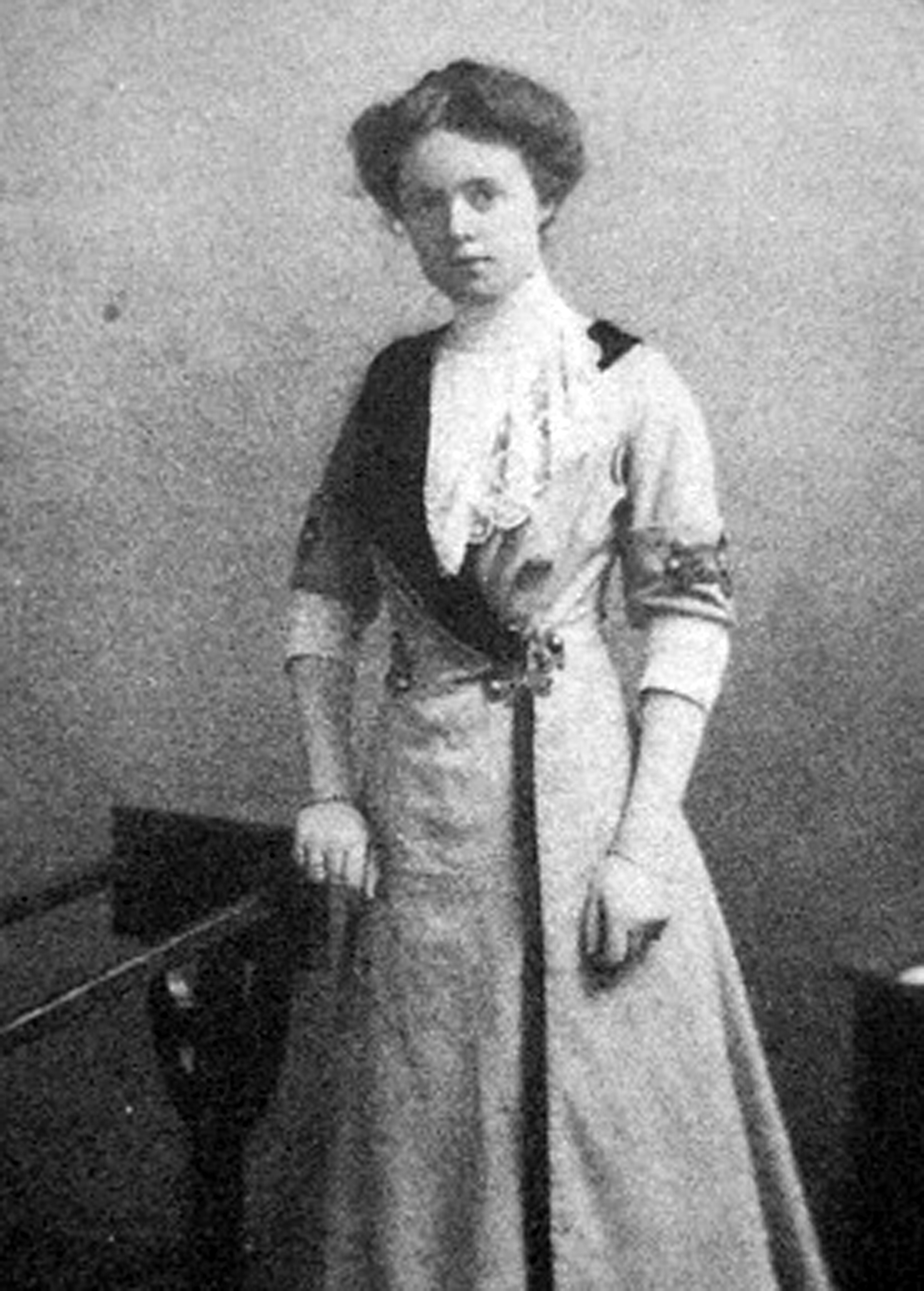
I. A. R. Wylie age 25 1910

The story was created by Ida Alexa Ross Wylie better known as I. A. R. Wylie (1885–1959). She was 31 years old when this movie was released based on a story she had published in the Saturday Evening Post. Wylie's writing career had taken off while she was still in her teens. Her first novel was adapted for the screen in 1915 and 4 more adaptations would follow before 1921. Over 30 movies were made between 1915 and 1953 were based on her works.

The screenplay was developed by Calder Johnstone (1880–1958) who started writing scenarios in 1914. Johnstone (1880–1958) was 36 years old when this film was released. He would go on to write the scenario for the next Davenport-Johnson vehicle Her Soul's Song released on June 15, then write the adaptation for A Yoke of Gold and both the story and adaptation for The Human Gamble.

=== Filming ===
On March 15, 1915, Laemmle opened the world's largest motion picture production facility, Universal City Studios. Since this film required no location shooting, it was filmed in its entirety at the new studio complex.

==== Working title ====
When films enter production, they need the means to reference the project. A Working title is assigned to the project. A Working Title can also be named an Alternate title. In many cases, a working title will become the release title.
Working titles are used primarily for two reasons:

- An official title for the project has not been determined
- A non-descript title to mask the real reason for making the movie.

In the May 6, 1916 issue of The Moving Picture World we see a reference to the film, The Other Women. This title is the working title before the film was retitled to Two Mothers.

== Release and reception ==
=== Official release ===
The copyright was filed with U.S. Copyright Office on May 24, 1916 and entered into the record as shown: (Note: The copyright was filed with U.S. Copyright Office and entered into the record as shown: Two Mothers. Laemmle. 1916. 2 reels. Credits:Producer, Lloyd Carleton; story, I.A.R. Wylie; scenario, Calder Johnstone. © Universal Film Mfg. Co., Inc.; 24May 2016; LP8348) and officially released on June 1, 1916.

=== Advertising ===
In 1916, movie companies spent more advertising dollars marketing feature films than promoting short films. A brief synopsis along with release dates was the norm for a short film while reserving the full-page ads for features. Universal recommended short films should be shown in conjunction with other short films to create a "diversified program."

The newspaper ad showing Two Mothers playing along with one other film. The other film was Ernest Shields, Harry Todd and his wife Margaret Joslin starring in the two-reel comedy production of It Can't Be True.

Referencing "The Universal Program" detailed above, this is an example of a "diversified program."

=== Reviews ===
Lengthy detailed reviews for short films were uncommon. The Hollywood magazines primarily reviewed feature films and only gave short films honorable mention. Of course, in 1916, movie magazines were evolving and becoming more sophisticated like the movies they checked and advertised.

In the May 6, 1916 issue of The Moving Picture World, Robert C. McElravy states:

"Certain unusual features of plot and presentation render this an appealing two-reel number, not so much from any extravagance of setting but because the main situation is quite original. It is the story of a man who married two operatic stars. . . Dorothy Davenport handles the part of Violetta in an appealing manner, obtaining considerable pathos in the latter scenes."

In the June 3, 1916 issue of the Motion Picture News, the review observes:

"This is a most unusual feature of life on the operatic stage, constructed in the original style and worked out effectively."

== Preservation status ==
Many silent-era films did not survive for reasons as explained on this Wikipedia page. (Note: Film is history. With every foot of film lost, we lose a link to our culture, the world around us, each other, and ourselves. – Martin Scorsese, filmmaker, director NFPF Board A report by Library of Congress film historian and archivist David Pierce estimates that: around 75% of original silent-era films have perished; 14% of the 10,919 silent films released by major studios exist in their original 35 mm or other formats; 11% survive only in full-length foreign versions or film formats of lesser image quality.)

According to the Library of Congress, all known copies of this film are lost.

== Gallery ==
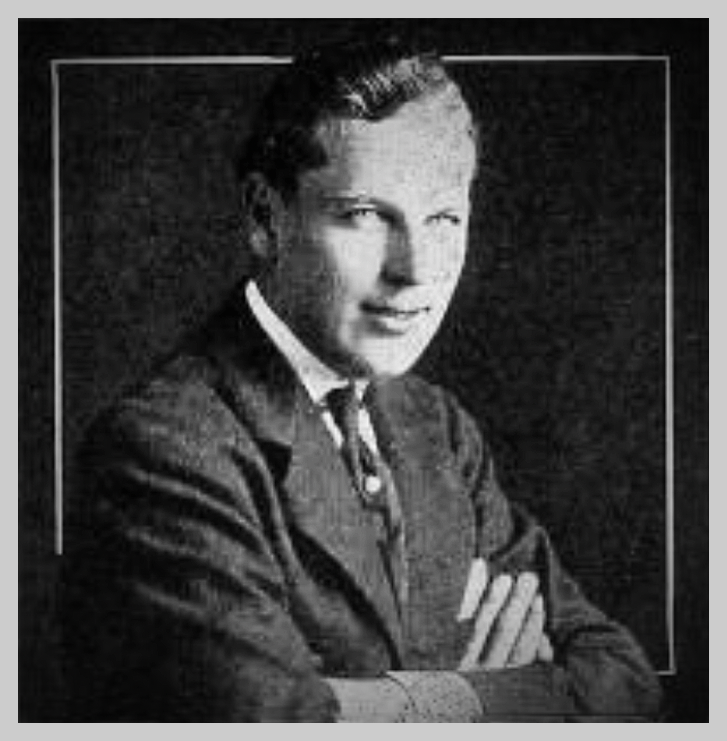
Emory Johnson 1916

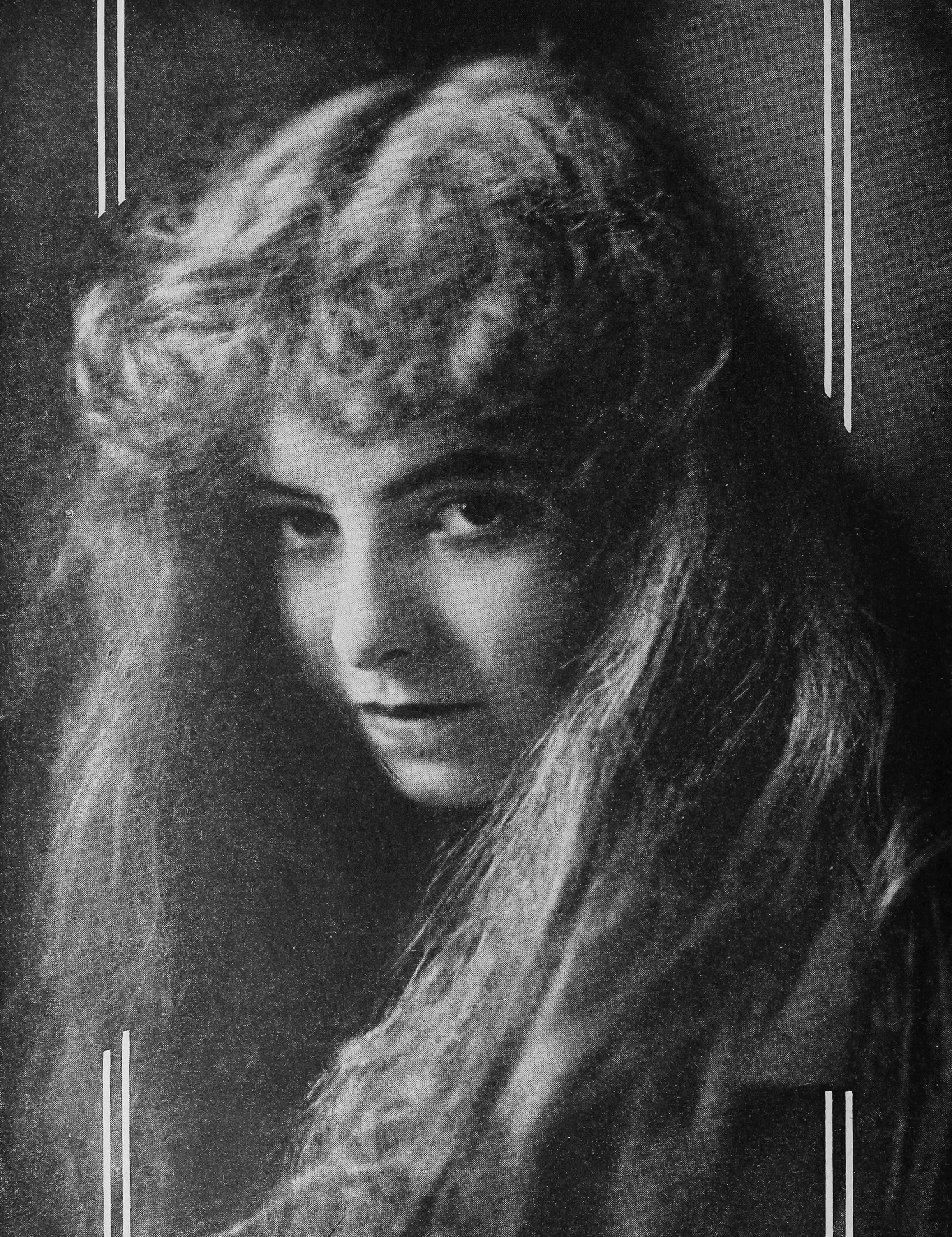
Dorothy Davenport 1914

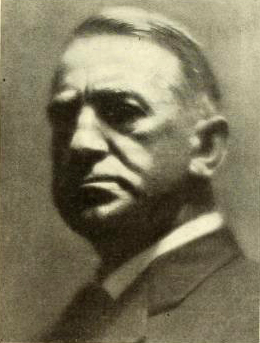
Alfred Allen 1919

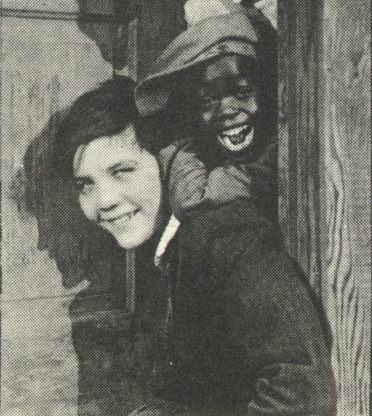
Gordon Griffith

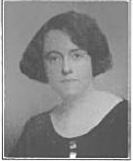
I. A. R. Wylie Author

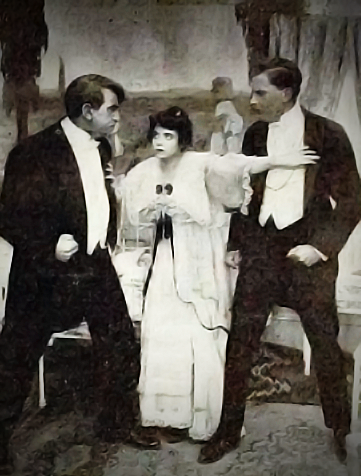
Movie still

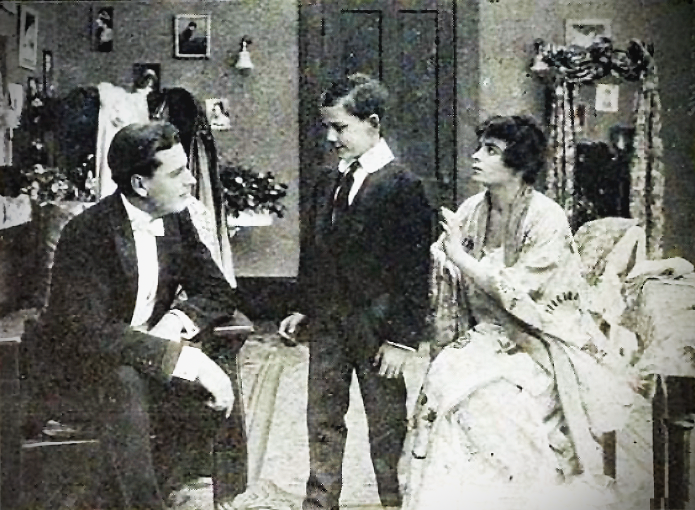
Movie still

== Sources ==
- Braff, R.E. (1999). The Universal Silents: A Filmography of the Universal Motion Picture Manufacturing Company, 1912-1929. McFarland. ISBN 978-0-7864-0287-8.
- Fleming, E.J. (2010). Wallace Reid: The Life and Death of a Hollywood Idol. McFarland. ISBN 978-0-7864-8266-5.
- Hirschhorn, Clive (1983). The Universal Story - The Complete History of the Studio and its 2,641 films. New York: Crown Publishing Group. pp. 22–23. ISBN 0-517-55001-6.
- Holmstrom, J. (1996). The Moving Picture Boy: An International Encyclopaedia from 1895 to 1995. Michael Russell. ISBN 978-0-85955-178-6.
- Keil, C.; Stamp, S. (2004). American Cinema's Transitional Era: Audiences, Institutions, Practices. ACLS Humanities E-Book. University of California Press. ISBN 978-0-520-24027-8.
- Wylie, I.A.R. (2013). My Life with George: An Unconventional Autobiography by I. A. R. Wylie. Literary Licensing, LLC. ISBN 978-1-4940-9586-4.
