= Lloyd B. Carleton =

American actor, director, producer and writer

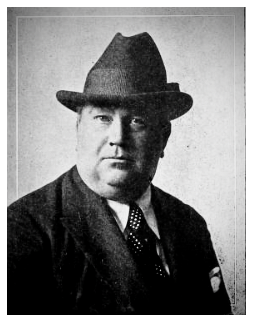
- 1916 Motion Picture News
- Born: Carleton B. Little; 1872; New York City, New York
- Died: August 8, 1933 (aged 61); New York City, New York
- Burial place: Trinity Cemetery, West 155th St; New York City
- Other names: L.B. Carleton; Lloyd Carleton
- Education: Columbia College (New York)
- Occupations: Actor, Director, Producer, Writer
- Years active: 1900–1930
- Era: Silent era
- Notable work: Walls of Jericho (1914); Mountain Madness (1920); Flying Dutchman (1923); Nine and Three-Fifths Seconds (1925)
- Height: 5 ft 10 in (178 cm)

Signature
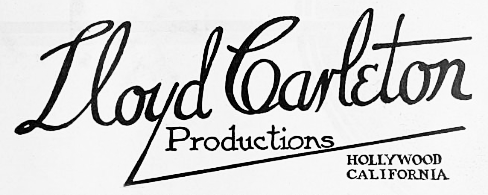

Lloyd Bassitt Carleton (c. 1872 - August 8, 1933) was an American director, producer, and actor.

Born in New York City in c. 1872, both of his parents were born in Virginia. Carleton's father, John T. Little Senior, supported the family as a clothing importer. The couple firstborn was John T. Little Jr. born in 1868. Carleton Bassitt Little followed in c. 1872. Their last child Arthur W. Little was born in 1878. The two older brothers graduated from Columbia College with law degrees. John Jr would become one of New York's finest lawyers. Carleton briefly tried the legal profession but became driven by a different calling.

By 1900, he was acting on Broadway. He became involved with stage managing, production, stock players, and managing some of the theater's most significant names. During this time, Charles Frohman suggested he adopt the stage name of Lloyd B. Carleton. After a brief stint in Australia, a new visual media struck his fancy. Movies were continuing their upward spiral. After studying film-making techniques at the American Biograph studios, acting in a 1910 film, he got a job directing movies at Thanhouser. He would continue to direct movies at Lubin, Selig, Universal, and Clermont Photoplays. He formed his own production company, Lloyd Carleton Productions, and used a variety of distributors.

His film endeavors ended in 1928. He moved back to New York. He managed to act in one final broadway play before his death on August 8, 1933.

◆ Theatrical Roles of Lloyd B. Carleton ◆
Year	Play	Start	End	Lead	Produce	Director	Shows	Theatre	Ref
1900	The Little Minister	Apr 1900	Apr 1900	Maude Adams	Charles Frohman	Joseph Humphreys	19	Powers' Theatre Chicago, IL	
1900	L'Aiglon	Oct 1900	Dec 1900	Maude Adams	Charles Frohman	Joseph Humphreys	73	Knickerbocker	
1900	A Royal Family	Sep 1900	Feb 1901	Richard Bennett	Charles Frohman	Joseph Humphreys	175	Lyceum	
1904	The Little Minister	Dec 1904	Feb 1905	Maude Adams	Charles Frohman	N/S	73	Empire	
1905	Peter Pan	Nov 1905	May 1906	Maude Adams	Charles Frohman	N/S	233	Empire	
1908	Quality Street	Jan 1908	Jan 1908	Maude Adams	N/S	N/S	7	Empire	
1908	The Jesters	Jan 1908	Mar 1908	Maude Adams	Charles Frohman	N/S	55	Empire	
1928	Brothers	Dec 1928	Aug 1929	Bert Lytell	John Henry Mears	Arthur Hurley	255	48th Street	

== Complete filmography ==
◆ Filmography of Lloyd B. Carleton ◆
Year	Film	Role	Production	Distribution	Genre	Length	Released	Notes
DIRECTOR
1910	St. Elmo	Director	Edwin Thanhouser	Thanhouser	Drama	Short	1910-03-22	
1910	She's Done It Again	Director	Edwin Thanhouser	Thanhouser	Drama	Short	1910-03-23	
1910	Daddy's Double	Director	Edwin Thanhouser	Thanhouser	Drama	Short	1910-04-05	
1910	A 29-Cent Robbery	Director	Edwin Thanhouser	Thanhouser	Comedy	Short	1910-04-15	
1910	She Wanted to Marry a Hero	Director	Edwin Thanhouser	Thanhouser	Comedy	Short	1910-04-29	
1910	Jane Eyre	Director	Edwin Thanhouser	Thanhouser	Drama	Short	1910-05-06	
1912	Love Versus Strategy	Director	Lubin	General Film	Comedy	Short	1912-01-31	
1912	Tricked Into Happiness	Director	Lubin	General Film	Comedy	Short	1912-02-07	
1912	His Mistake	Director	Lubin	General Film	Drama	Short	1912-02-14	
1912	Love and Tears	Director	Lubin	General Film	Drama	Short	1912-02-18	
1912	The Price of a Silver Fox	Director	Lubin	General Film	Drama	Short	1912-03-14	
1912	The Surprise Party Surprised	Director	Lubin	General Film	Comedy	Short	1912-03-20	
1912	The Social Secretary	Director	Lubin	General Film	Drama	Short	1912-03-30	
1912	The Reformation of Kid Hogan	Director	Lubin	General Film	Drama	Short	1912-04-08	
1912	A New Beginning	Director	Lubin	General Film	Drama	Short	1912-04-22	
1912	The Good for Nothing	Director	Lubin	General Film	Drama	Short	1912-11-18	
1912	Satin and Gingham	Director	Lubin	General Film	Drama	Short	1912-11-28	
1912	When Love Leads	Director	Lubin	General Film	Drama	Short	1912-12-18	
1913	Literature and Love	Director	Lubin	General Film	Drama	Short	1913-01-20	
1913	Longing for a Mother	Director	Lubin	General Film	Romance	Short	1913-01-20	
1913	The Lost Note	Director	Lubin	General Film	Drama	Short	1913-02-03	
1913	For His Child's Sake	Director	Lubin	General Film	Drama	Short	1913-04-08	
1913	Diamond Cut Diamond	Director	Lubin	General Film	Drama	Short	1913-04-25	
1913	The Veil of Sleep	Director	Lubin	General Film	Drama	Short	1913-05-01	
1913	Margaret's Painting	Director	Lubin	General Film	Drama	Short	1913-05-19	
1913	The Angel of the Slums	Director	Lubin	General Film	Drama	Short	1913-07-03	
1913	The Wiles of Cupid	Director	Lubin	General Film	Romance	Short	1913-07-17	
1913	The Governor	Director	Lubin	General Film	Drama	Short	1913-08-04	
1913	The Special Officer	Director	Lubin	General Film	Drama	Short	1913-10-02	
1913	The Two Cowards	Director	Lubin	General Film	Drama	Short	1913-10-07	
1913	The Fiancée and the Fairy	Director	Lubin	General Film	Drama	Short	1913-10-13	
1913	Shadows	Director	Lubin	General Film	Drama	Short	1913-11-18	
1914	Through Fire to Fortune	Director	Lubin	General Film	Drama	Feature	1914-02-01	
1914	The Price	Director	Lubin	General Film	Drama	Short	1914-03-20	
1914	At His Expense	Director	Lubin	General Film	Comedy	Short	1914-04-11	
1914	Strength of Family Ties	Director	Lubin	General Film	Drama	Short	1914-04-16	
1914	A Leaf from the Past	Director	Lubin	General Film	Drama	Short	1914-05-21	
1914	Codes of Honor	Director	Lubin	General Film	Drama	Short	1914-07-15	
1914	His Brother's Blood	Director	Lubin	General Film	Drama	Short	1914-08-20	
1914	The Investment	Director	Lubin	General Film	Drama	Short	1914-09-25	
1914	The Ragged Earl	Director	Popular Plays and Players	Alco Film	Comedy	Feature	1914-10-12	
1914	The Impostor	Director	Lubin	General Film	Drama	Short	1914-10-15	
1914	Michael Strogoff	Director	Lubin	General Film	Drama	Feature	1914-10-19	
1914	The Walls of Jericho	Director	Box Office Attractions	Box Office Attractions	Drama	Feature	1914-11-19	
1914	The Idler	Director	Fox Film	Box Office Attractions	Drama	Feature	1914-12-13	
1915	The Girl I Left Behind Me	Director	Fox Film	Box Office Attractions	Western	Feature	1915-01-01	
1915	Motherhood	Director	Selig	General Film	Drama	Short	1915-06-22	
1915	A Studio Escapade	Director	Selig	General Film	Drama	Short	1915-07-05	
1915	The Girl with the Red Feather	Director	Selig	General Film	Drama	Short	1915-08-23	
1915	The Jungle Lovers	Director	Selig	General Film	Adventure	Short	1915-09-15	
1915	In the Midst of African Wilds	Director	Selig	General Film	Drama	Short	1915-10-16	
1915	The Flashlight	Director	Selig	General Film	Drama	Short	1915-11-01	
1915	Their Sinful Influence	Director	Selig	General Film	Drama	Short	1915-11-04	
1915	The White Light of Publicity	Director	Selig	General Film	Drama	Short	1915-11-13	
1915	The Love of Loti San	Director	Selig	General Film	Drama	Short	1915-12-02	
1915	The Golden Spurs	Director	Selig	General Film	Western	Short	1915-12-16	
1915	The Sacred Tiger of Agra	Director	Selig	General Film	Drama	Short	1915-12-25	
1916	The Yaqui	Director	Universal	Universal	Western	Feature	1916-03-19	
1916	Two Men of Sandy Bar	Director	Universal	Universal	Western	Feature	1916-04-03	
1916	Doctor Neighbor	Director	Universal	Universal	Drama	Feature	1916-05-01	
1916	Her Husband's Faith	Director	Universal	Universal	Drama	Short	1916-05-11	
1916	Heartaches (1916 film)	Director	Universal	Universal	Drama	Short	1916-05-19	
1916	Two Mothers	Director	Universal	Universal	Drama	Short	1916-06-01	
1916	Her Soul's Song	Director	Universal	Universal	Drama	Short	1916-06-15	
1916	The Way of the World	Director	Universal	Universal	Drama	Feature	1916-07-03	
1916	No. 16 Martin Street	Director	Universal	Universal	Drama	Short	1916-07-13	
1916	A Yoke of Gold	Director	Universal	Universal	Western	Feature	1916-08-14	
1916	The Unattainable	Director	Universal	Universal	Drama	Feature	1916-09-04	
1916	Black Friday	Director	Universal	Universal	Drama	Feature	1916-09-18	
1916	The Human Gamble	Director	Rex Motion Picture	Universal	Drama	Short	1916-10-08	
1916	Barriers of Society	Director	Universal	Universal	Drama	Feature	1916-10-16	
1916	The Devil's Bondwoman	Director	Universal	Universal	Drama	Feature	1916-11-20	
1916	The Morals of Hilda	Director	Universal	Universal	Drama	Feature	1916-12-11	
1920	Mountain Madness	Director	Clermont Photoplays	Republic Dist	Drama	Feature	1920-08-02	
1922	Beyond the Crossroads	Director	Clermont Photoplays	Pioneer Film	Drama	Feature	1922-01-27	
1923	The Flying Dutchman	Director	Robertson-Cole	FBO	Drama	Feature	1923-07-29	
1925	Nine and Three-Fifths Seconds	Director	A.G. Steen	B.A. Goodman Prod	Drama	Feature	1925-08-05	
1925	The Young Sheriff	Director	Lloyd Carleton Prod	A.G. Steen	Western	Short	1925-10-02	
1925	The Man Who Rode Alone	Director	Lloyd Carleton Prod	A.G. Steen	Western	Short	1925-10-08	
1925	Flash of a .45	Director	Lloyd Carleton Prod	A.G. Steen	Western	Short	1925-10-10	
1925	The Mad Miner	Director	Lloyd Carleton Prod	A.G. Steen	Western	Short	1925-10-10	
ACTOR
1910	Simple Charity	Actor	Biograph	General Film	Drama	Short	1910-11-10	
1914	Michael Strogoff	Actor	Lubin	General Film	Drama	Feature	1914-10-19	
1927	Tongues of Scandal	Actor	Sterling Pictures	Sterling Pictures	Drama	Feature	1927-01-03	
PRODUCER
1915	In the Midst of African Wilds	Producer	Selig	General Film	Drama	Short	1915-10-16	
1915	The White Light of Publicity	Producer	Selig	General Film	Drama	Short	1915-11-13	
1915	The Sacred Tiger of Agra	Producer	Selig	General Film	Drama	Short	1915-12-25	
1916	Her Husband's Faith	Producer	Lloyd Carleton Prod	Universal	Drama	Short	1916-05-11	
1918	Mother, I Need You	Producer	Lloyd Carleton Prod	Ernest Shipman	Drama	Short	1918-09-21	
1920	The Amazing Woman	Producer	Lloyd Carleton Prod	Republic Dist	Drama	Feature	1920-01-01	
1920	Mountain Madness	Producer	Clermont Photoplays	Republic Dist	Drama	Feature	1920-08-02	
1925	The Young Sheriff	Producer	Lloyd Carleton Prod	A.G. Steen	Western	Short	1925-10-02	
1925	The Man Who Rode Alone	Producer	Lloyd Carleton Prod	A.G. Steen	Western	Short	1925-10-08	
1925	Flash of a .45	Producer	Lloyd Carleton Prod	A.G. Steen	Western	Short	1925-10-10	
1925	The Mad Miner	Producer	Lloyd Carleton Prod	A.G. Steen	Western	Short	1925-10-10	
1927	Girl in the Rain	Producer	Lloyd Carleton Prod	Kernan Films	Drama	Feature	1927-02-10	
WRITER
1913	Diamond Cut Diamond	Writer	Lubin	General Film	Drama	Short	1913-04-25	
1914	The Walls of Jericho	Writer	Box Office Attractions	Box Office Attractions	Drama	Feature	1914-11-19	
1916	Heartaches (1916 film)	Writer	Universal	Universal	Drama	Short	1916-05-19	
1923	The Flying Dutchman	Writer	Robertson-Cole	FBO	Drama	Feature	1923-07-29	
