= Clive Hirschhorn =

South African writer and critic (born 1940)

Clive Hirschhorn (born February 20, 1940) is a South African writer and critic known for his long tenure as film and theater critic for the British Sunday Express newspaper and as the author of several books.

== Early life and journalism ==
Born in Johannesburg, South Africa, son of hotelier Colin Kalman and Pearl (Rabinowitz) Hirschhorn, He attended the University of Witwatersrand, Johannesburg, receiving a B.A. in 1960.

While still a student at the University of Witwatersrand, Hirschhorn wrote A State of Innocence, a play which was presented at the Library Theatre in Johannesburg. Between 1960 and 1963, he was deputy film and theater critic of the Johannesburg's Sunday Times and freelanced for both The Rand Daily Mail and the Johannesburg Sunday Express.

Hirschhorn left South Africa for London in April, 1963 and in 1964 became a story editor at the UK's ABC, a franchise holder for the ITV network.

The following year, he briefly worked as a pop-columnist for the Daily Mail, before joining the Sunday Express in 1965 as an interviewer. In 1966, in addition to his feature writing, he was appointed the paper's film and theater critic – a position he held for nearly 30 years until he left the paper in 1995. Among the many luminaries Hirschhorn interviewed and profiled for the Sunday Express were Tennessee Williams, Marlene Dietrich, Mae West (who was also the subject of a biography by Hirschhorn), Noël Coward, Jack Nicholson, Dustin Hoffman, Judy Garland (in her very last interview), Rita Hayworth, Bing Crosby, Billy Wilder, George Burns, James Stewart, Alfred Hitchcock, Woody Allen, Mel Brooks, Rosalind Russell, Betty Grable, David Niven, Rex Harrison, Yul Brynner, Sammy Davis Jr., Julie Andrews, Arnold Schwarzenegger, Kirk Douglas, Tony Curtis, Mickey Rooney, and Ginger Rogers.

In 1996, Hirschhorn became editor of the theater magazine Applause and since 1998 has been the theater critic of the magazine This Is London.

== Books ==
Beyond the many features, reviews, and interviews written for the Sunday Express, Hirschhorn is the author of several well-received books about the film industry and its stars:

Library Journal called his authorized biography of Gene Kelly "well-researched" and praised its "warmth and immediacy". Writing in the Chicago Tribune Book World, Richard Christiansen named The Warner Bros. Story a "bounteous treasure trove of information and entertainment" while Choice remarked that Hirschhorn's entries for the films were "frequently witty and even critical…they are reviews as much as they are narratives". Newsweek admired The Hollywood Musical because Hirschhorn "aims at a kind of completeness entirely in keeping with the grandiosity of his subject", a sentiment echoed by Seymour Peck in The New York Times Book Review, who noted that Hirschhorn "sets himself the goal of absolute completeness…and seems to have achieved it."

Hirschhorn has given lectures on the Hollywood musical at the University of Cape Town's annual Summer School and at the Oxford Literary Festival.

== Book collecting ==
Beginning in the mid-1980s, Hirschhorn has put together "one of the world's finest collections of rare first-edition books", largely consisting of "almost all the most notable 20th-century authors". The collection included all the major work of Ernest Hemingway, F. Scott Fitzgerald, Graham Greene, William Faulkner and John Steinbeck.

In October 2012, Hirschhorn made news when he put up for auction a significant portion of his extensive collection. The Express reported around 500 in all. Among the "highspots" were a jacketed first edition of The Great Gatsby, an inscribed copy (to Hirschhorn by Harper Lee) of To Kill A Mockingbird, Ian Fleming's first Bond novel, Casino Royale, Graham Greene's personal copy (with his signature on the front end-paper) of Bram Stoker's Dracula, an inscribed copy of Evelyn Waugh's A Handful of Dust and a signed copy of Gone with the Wind.

Hirschhorn maintains an ongoing collection of film and theater-related material which is not for sale, with the aim to make it one of the most comprehensive private collections of film and theater material in the world.

== Bibliography ==
- Gene Kelly (Introduction by Frank Sinatra), W.H. Allen, 1974; Henry Regnery, 1975. Updated and reprinted by St. Martin's Press in 1985.
- The Films of James Mason, L.S.P. Books, 1975; Citadel, 1977.
- The Warner Bros. Story, Octopus, 1978; Crown, 1978. Reprinted 1980.
- The Hollywood Musical, Octopus, 1981, Crown, 1981. Reprinted and updated 2000.
- The Universal Story, Octopus, 1983, Crown 1983. Reprinted and updated 1999, Hamlyn.
- The Columbia Story, Octopus, 1989, Crown 1990. Reprinted and updated 2000 Hamlyn.
- Mae West: An Interview & Biography, Grand Cyrus Press, 2009.
