= Richard Morris (actor) =

American actor and opera singer

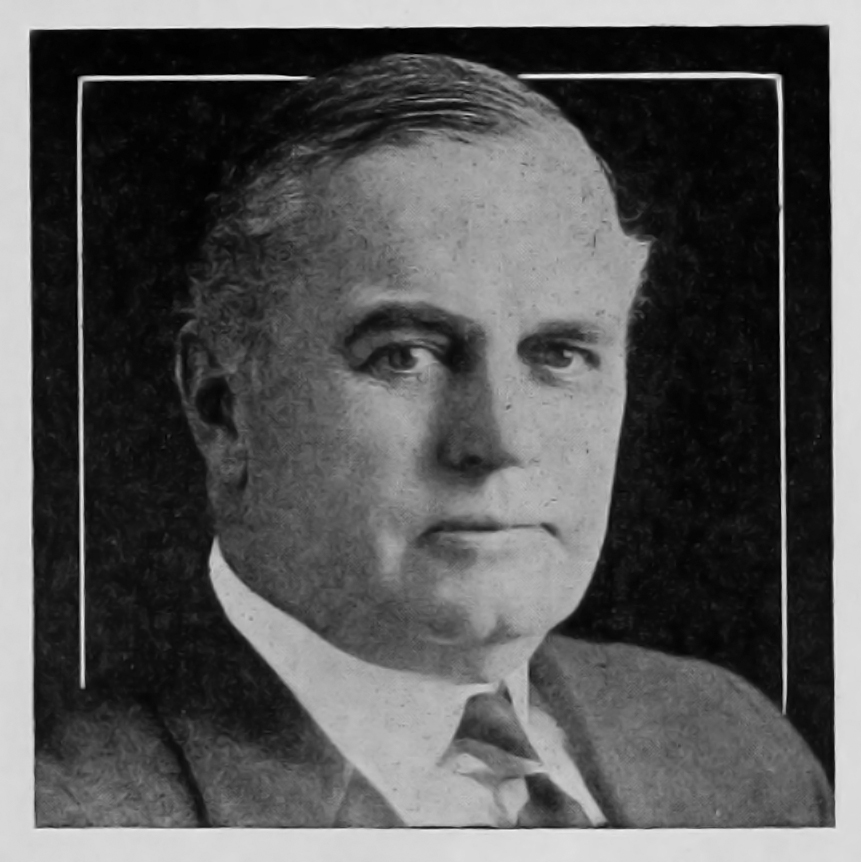
- Morris in 1916
- Born: William Richard Stuart Morris; January 30, 1862; Charlestown, Massachusetts, U.S.
- Died: October 11, 1924 (aged 62); Los Angeles, California, U.S.
- Resting place: Los Angeles National Cemetery
- Occupations: Movie actor; Opera singer; Stage actor
- Years active: 1912–1924
- Era: Silent film
- Known for: The Spirit of the USA; The Third Alarm; The Sea Lion

Richard Morris (January 30, 1862 – October 11, 1924) was an American opera singer, stage performer, and silent film actor. Morris was born on January 30, 1862, in Charlestown, Massachusetts. He was 62 when he died in Los Angeles, California on October 11, 1924. Between 1912 and 1924, Richard Morris acted in 59 films.

== Early life ==
In Boston's oldest Irish neighborhood, William Richard Stuart Morris was born on January 30, 1862, to working-class Irish parents in Charlestown, Massachusetts. His father, William A. Morris, came from Ireland, while his mother, Catherine Keefe, was a native of Boston. Being the eldest son in an Irish Catholic household, he was given his father's name, continuing a long-held tradition observed by generations prior. The 1870 census lists Morris's father as an expressman and his mother as a homemaker. Over time, the Morris family expanded to include eight children.

During his early education, he spent three years overseas, undergoing training for grand opera. Unfortunately, no matriculation records are available to specify the nature of this training. Upon his return to America, he showcased his talent as an opera singer, performing for audiences in domestic venues during the 1880s.

In 1889, records show he maintained his Charlestown place of residence as his permanent residence. His mother, aged 59, died at home in 1898.

According to the 1900 census, William RS Morris, 36 years old, lived at the same address as his widowed father and five sisters. At 74, Morris's father died in 1907. At the time of his death, Morris was touring Europe.

== Career ==
=== Stage ===
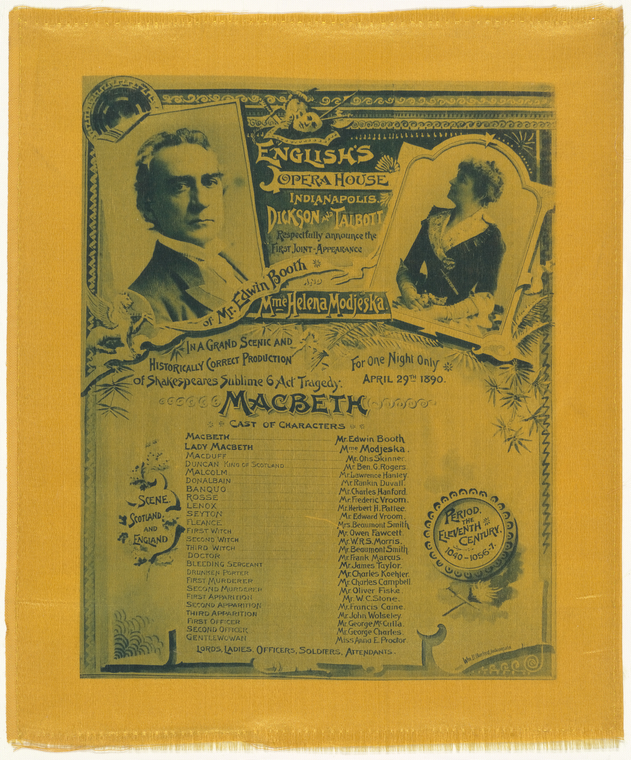
Edwin Booth and Helena Modjeska 1890

Early in his stage career, Morris worked in Shakespearean touring companies, e.g., Lawrence Barrett (1838-1891). In 1889, William Morris was 27 when he started acting with the renowned Shakespearean touring company of Edwin Booth (1833-1893) and Helena Modjeska (1840-1909). In Indianapolis, Indiana, on April 29, 1890, an evening performance of Macbeth was performed on the stage. A copy of the program features a listing of the cast of characters, including Mr. W.R.S. Morris, in the role of the second witch. The following year, 1891, Booth suffered a debilitating stroke, bringing an end to his stage career. On June 7, 1893, Edwin Booth died in New York City at age of 59.

He reunited with Helena Modjeska after her recovery from a stroke suffered in 1897. Morris eventually connected with Shakespearean actress Minna Gale (1868-1944) and her Repertory theatre. Like Morris, Gale had also lived in Europe, pursuing studies in music and theater. They had even more in common when they saw how their stage backgrounds helped them transition to acting on screen.

In 1906, the 44-year-old Morris departed for London. He returned to the operatic stage and continued to perform until 1909.

=== Lubin ===
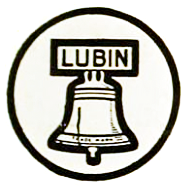
Lubin Manufacturing Company 1914

After spending three years in London, Morris returned to America in early 1909. He sought work in the burgeoning movie industry. Morris was 47, a late age when seeking employment in films. In September 1909, he joined the Lubin Manufacturing Company based in Philadelphia, Pennsylvania.

Lubin was an American motion picture company producing silent films from 1896 to 1916. Morris made his movie debut, playing an organ grinder in the Lubin-produced film Little Boy Blue released on May 6, 1912. Between 1912 and 1914, he acted in 25 films for Lubin, ending with the December 1914 release of "A Believer in Dreams." No records exist documenting whether Morris acted in any Lubin productions before 1912 or when he started using the screen name of Richard Morris.

During his time at Lubin, he met director Lloyd B. Carleton. Carleton had signed a Lubin contract in 1911, which gave him the opportunity to direct features and shorts. Carleton recognized Morris's value as a character actor, and they made three 2-reelers in 1914. Morris remained with Lubin until July 1914. Carleton departed Lubin in the Autumn 1914. Carleton had found a fellow performer from the Eastern stage with impeccable stage credentials. He remained one of Lloyd B. Carleton's favorite character actors. Between 1914 and 1920, Morris acted in 15 Lloyd B. Carleton-directed films.

After making more than a thousand motion pictures, the Lubin Manufacturing Company declared bankruptcy on September 1, 1916

=== Lasky and Selig ===
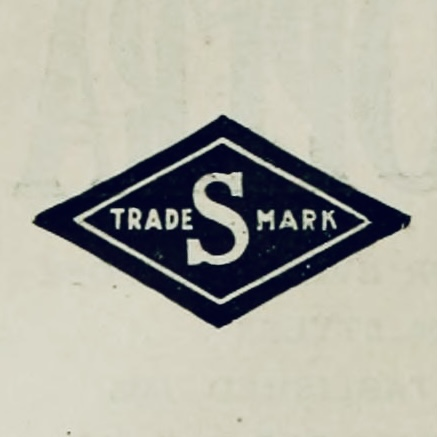
Selig-Polyscope 1915

In late Summer 1914, Morris traveled once again to London, England. During his stay in London, World War I was flaring up. On August 4, 1914, the United Kingdom declared war on Germany. Morris returned to American, arriving in New York on November 16, 1914. The ship's manifest lists William R Stuart Morris, born in Charlestown on January 30, 1862. The manifest further states he was single, 52 years old, and residing at 1108 Walnut Street, Philadelphia, Pennsylvania.

Between January and August 1915, Morris returned to making movies and acted in 4 films for various organizations, including Powers Picture Plays and Jesse L. Lasky Feature Play

In 1915, Morris signed a contract with Selig Polyscope based in Chicago, Illinois but having offices in Los Angeles. During his stay with Selig, he was reunited with Lloyd B. Carleton. Between September and December, Morris acted in 4 Carleton-directed short films. Morris's total film output for 1915 was 6 short movies and 2 feature-length. He made 3 more pictures for Selig Polyscope before departing.

=== Universal ===
Lloyd Carleton signed a Universal contract in the autumn of 1915. Richard Morris signed a Universal contract in 1916 and permanently moved to Los Angeles, California.

Morris reunited with Lloyd B. Carleton again and acted in the Red Feather feature-length production of A Yoke of Gold released on August 14, 1916. The same film provided an introduction to Emory Johnson. This relationship would prove beneficial in the coming years.

Between August 1916 and December, Morris would act in 7 Lloyd Carleton-directed films. All films were feature-length with the sole exception of the 2-reeler The Human Gamble. All films would feature Emory Johnson in the lead. The feature-length films were:

- A Yoke of Gold Red Feather film released in August
- The Unattainable Bluebird film released in September
- Black Friday Red Feather film released in September
- Barriers of Society Red Feather film released in October
- The Devil's Bondwoman Red Feather film released in November
- The Morals of Hilda Red Feather film released in December (his last film for Universal)

1916 would be Morris's glory year in films. He had successfully made the transition from filming 2-reelers to feature-length movies. He would continue to shoot only feature-length films for the remainder of his career.

=== FBO ===
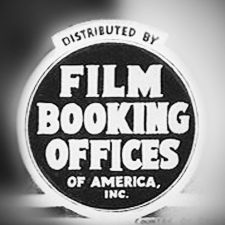
Film Booking Offices 1926

After he departed from Universal in 1916, his picture output declined. He was an actor in his later 50s looking for work in a youth-obsessed industry. He acted in one film in 1918 and another one in 1919. He made 4 films in 1920, including reuniting with Lloyd Carleton to act in The Amazing Woman.

In January 1921, Richard Morris turned 59-years-old. In 1921, Hobart Bosworth productions invited Morris to play the part of Uncle Billy in The Sea Lion. He acted with Hobart Bosworth, Emory Johnson and Bessie Love. It was the only movie Morris filmed in 1921.

Emory Johnson embarked upon a career as a director in 1922. Johnson's first film was the FBO feature-length production of In the Name of the Law. When Johnson evaluated players for his first movie, Johnson probably recalled Morris had acted in 7 movies with him in 1916. Johnson hired the aging actor to play the role of Dr. Lucus in his first film.

Richard Morris would continue to appear in FBO productions directed by Emory Johnson including The Third Alarm, The West~Bound Limited, The Mailman and The Spirit of the USA until his untimely death in October 1924.

== Alternate names ==
Richard Morris used many different pseudonyms during his career, including:

- Dick Morris
- Mr. Richard Morris
- Mr. W.R.S. Morris
- William Morris
- Stuart Morris
- William R S Morris

== Death ==
The 1920 census registers Richard Morris as a single 57-year-old lodger living in Los Angeles. His listed occupation is an actor. The Emory Johnson-directed film The Spirit of the USA was released by Film Booking Offices of America on May 18, 1924. It would be Richard Morris's last movie.

On Saturday, October 11, 1924, Richard Stewart Morris died in Los Angeles, California. The newspaper listed him as being 63 years-old. (His real age was 62 ) when he died. A simple obituary appeared in the Los Angeles Times on October 13, 1924:

MORRIS, Richard Stewart Morris, aged 63 years, a native of Boston, MASS.
Services at 2 pm Tuesday at Le Roy Bagley's parlors, 5440 Hollywood Blvd.,
Rev. Neal Dodd officiating

— The Los Angeles Times 1924

The funeral was held at the Pierce Brothers LeRoy Bagley Mortuary Hollywood, California with "The padre of Hollywood", the Rev. Neal Dodd officiating. That same year, Rev Dodd would become a founding member of a relief fund to aid film workers in need. A brief obituary would appear in The Boston Globe noting the death of William Richard Stuart Morris. Richard Morris was buried in the Los Angeles National Cemetery.

== Filmography ==
◆ Filmography of Richard Morris ◆
Year	Title	Role	Production	Distribution	Released	Genre	Reels
1924	The Spirit of the USA	Grandpa Gains	Emory Johnson	FBO	May 18, 1924	Melodrama	Full
1923	The Mailman	Admiral Fleming	Emory Johnson	FBO	Sep 12, 1923	Melodrama	Full
1923	The West~Bound Limited	Bernard Miller	Emory Johnson	FBO	Apr 15, 1923	Melodrama	Full
1922	The Third Alarm	Dr. Rutherford	Emory Johnson	FBO	Dec 1, 1922	Melodrama	Full
1922	In the Name of the Law	Mr. Lucas	Emory Johnson	FBO	Aug 16, 1922	Melodrama	Full
1921	The Sea Lion	Billy	Hobart Bosworth	Associated Producers	Dec 5, 1921	Melodrama	Full
1920	The Gift Supreme	Unknown	Macauley Photoplays	Republic Dist Corp	May 9, 1920	Melodrama	Full
1920	Parted Curtains	Unknown	National Film Corp	Warner Bros.	Apr 2, 1920	Drama	Full
1920	The Walk-Offs	Judge Brent	Screen Classics Inc	Metro Pictures	Feb 1, 1920	Comedy	Full
1920	The Amazing Woman	Gaston Duval	Lloyd Carleton	Republic Dist Corp	Jan 1, 1920	Drama	Full
1919	Blind Man's Eyes	Gabriel Warden	Metro Pictures	Metro Pictures	Mar 19, 1919	Drama	Full
1918	Hobbs in a Hurry	Rufus Renshaw	American Film Company	Pathé Exchange	Oct 6, 1918	Western	Full
1916	The Morals of Hilda	Harris Grail	Universal Studios	Universal Studios	Dec 11, 1916	Drama	Full
1916	The Devil's Bondwoman	Prince Vandloup	Universal Studios	Universal Studios	Nov 20, 1916	Drama	Full
1916	Barriers of Society	Harry Arnold	Universal Studios	Universal Studios	Oct 16, 1916	Drama	Full
1916	The Human Gamble	Frank Garner	Universal Studios	Universal Studios	Oct 8, 1916	Drama	Short
1916	Black Friday	Richard Strong	Universal Studios	Universal Studios	Sep 18, 1916	Drama	Full
1916	The Unattainable	Henry Morton	Universal Studios	Universal Studios	Sep 4, 1916	Drama	Full
1916	A Yoke of Gold	Padre Amador	Universal Studios	Universal Studios	Aug 14, 1916	Drama	Full
1916	The Regeneration of Jim Halsey	The Man	Selig Polyscope	General Film	Mar 13, 1916	Drama	Short
1916	The Grinning Skull	John Dermond	Selig Polyscope	General Film	Feb 28, 1916	Drama	Short
1916	The Buried Treasure of Cobre	Colonel Goddard	Selig Polyscope	General Film	Jan 3, 1916	Drama	Short
1915	The Golden Spurs	Colonel Ryder	Selig Polyscope	General Film	Dec 16, 1915	Drama	Short
1915	The Love of Loti San	Unknown	Selig Polyscope	General Film	Dec 2, 1915	Drama	Short
1915	Their Sinful Influence	Rev. Dr. Carr	Selig Polyscope	General Film	Nov 4, 1915	Drama	Short
1915	The Jungle Lovers	Van Cleeve	Selig Polyscope	General Film	Sep 16, 1915	Drama	Short
1915	The Marriage of Kitty	John Travers	Jesse L. Lasky	Paramount	Aug 16, 1915	Drama	Full
1915	The Fighting Hope	Craven	Jesse L. Lasky	Paramount	Jul 19, 1915	Drama	Full
1915	Was She a Vampire?	Richard Desmond	Powers Picture Plays	Universal Studios	Jul 10, 1915	Drama	Short
1915	Wildfire (1915 film)	Robert W. Barrington	World Film	World Film	Jan 25, 1915	Drama	Short
1914	A Believer in Dreams	Unknown	Lubin	General Film	Dec 4, 1914	Drama	Short
1914	The Impostor II	Horace Cadby	Lubin	General Film	Oct 15, 1914	Drama	Short
1914	His Brother's Blood	Tyson Brooks	Lubin	General Film	Aug 20, 1914	Drama	Short
1914	Codes of Honor	Kid Hogg	Lubin	General Film	Jul 15, 1914	Drama	Short
1914	A Leaf from the Past	Dick Trent	Lubin	General Film	May 21, 1914	Drama	Short
1914	The Klondike Bubble	Hungerford Wolf	Lubin	General Film	Apr 22, 1914	Drama	Short
1914	Strength of Family Ties	John Brant	Lubin	General Film	Apr 16, 1914	Drama	Short
1914	Through Fire to Fortune	George Bowers	Lubin	General Film	Feb 1, 1914	Drama	Full
1914	The Lion and the Mouse	Ex-Judge Scott	Lubin	General Film	Jan 1, 1914	Drama	Full
1913	The Smuggler's Daughter III	Girot - the Smuggler	Lubin	General Film	Dec 3, 1913	Drama	Short
1913	Partners in Crime II	Howard Jansen - Esther's Father	Lubin	General Film	Nov 20, 1913	Drama	Short
1913	When the Earth Trembled	Richard Sims	Lubin	General Film	Nov 2, 1913	Drama	3 reel
1913	A Deal in Oil	The Father	Lubin	General Film	Oct 14, 1913	Drama	Short
1913	Mary's Temptation	The Convict Husband	Lubin	General Film	Aug 13, 1913	Drama	Short
1913	The Faith of a Girl	Richard Starley	Lubin	General Film	May 30, 1913	Drama	Short
1913	Granny (I)	Peter Richards	Lubin	General Film	Apr 29, 1913	Drama	Short
1913	Pete Tries the Stage	LeGrade - Hotel Proprietor	Lubin	General Film	Apr 12, 1913	Comedy	Short
1913	Heroes One and All	The Burglar	Lubin	General Film	Mar 29, 1913	Drama	Short
1913	Memories of His Youth	Unknown	Lubin	General Film	Mar 27, 1913	Drama	Short
1913	Pete, the Artist	Unknown	Lubin	General Film	Mar 22, 1913	Drama	Short
1913	Pete Joins the Force	Unknown	Lubin	General Film	Mar 8, 1913	Comedy	Short
1913	Auntie's Affinity	The Hotel Proprietor	Lubin	General Film	Mar 1, 1913	Drama	Short
1912	The Wonderful One-Horse Shay	Abe Hobbs	Lubin	General Film	Dec 10, 1912	Drama	Short
1912	By the Sea		Lubin	General Film	Dec 2, 1912	Drama	Short
1912	The Doctor's Debt	Dr. Richard Morris	Lubin	General Film	Sep 28, 1912	Drama	Short
1912	The Derelict's Return	The Doctor	Lubin	General Film	Jul 31, 1912	Drama	Short
1912	A Child's Prayer	Dick Morris - Devereaux's Foreman	Lubin	General Film	Jul 4, 1912	Drama	Short
1912	A Modern Portia	Earl Manning aka John White	Lubin	General Film	Jun 8, 1912	Drama	Short
1912	Little Boy Blue	The Organ Grinder	Lubin	General Film	May 6, 1912	Comedy	Short

== Gallery ==
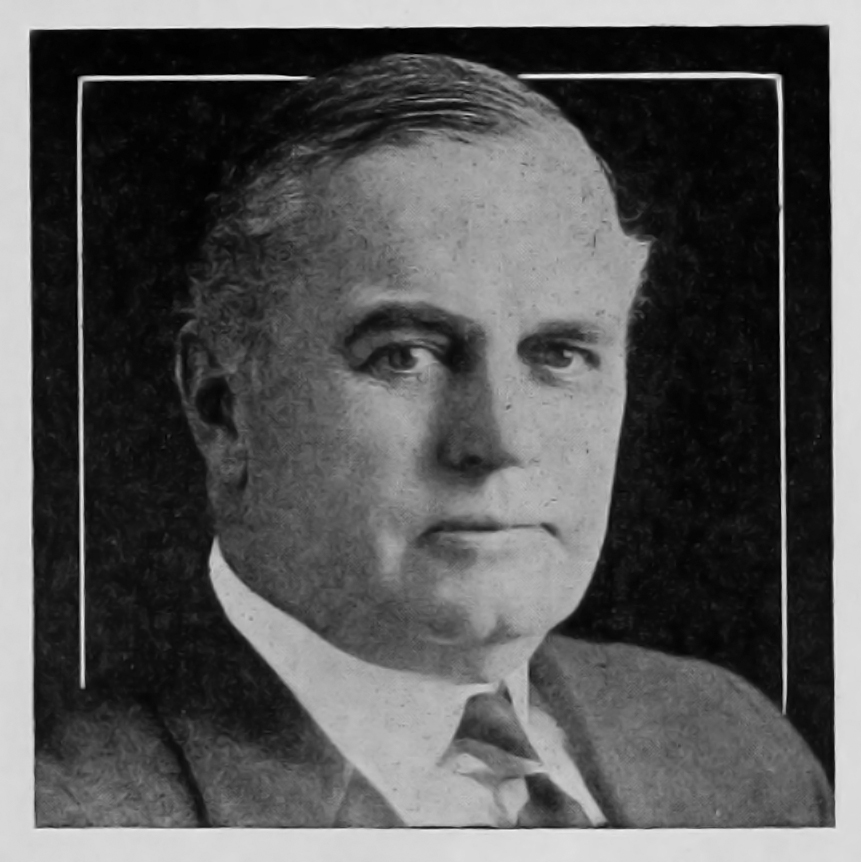
Richard Morris 1916
Movie Actor

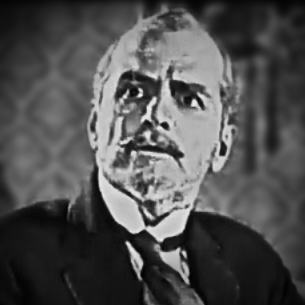
Richard Morris 1922
The Third Alarm
Dr. Rutherford

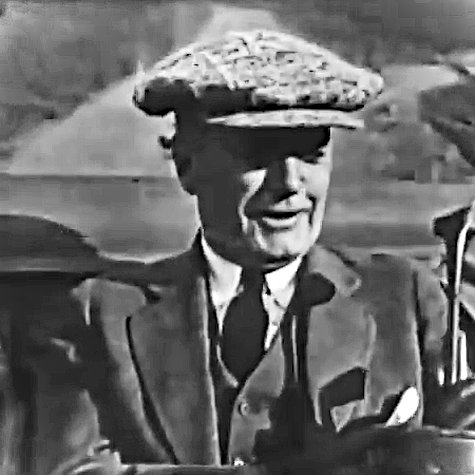
Richard Morris 1923
The West~Bound Limited
Bernard Miller
