= Mary Warren (actress) =

American actress

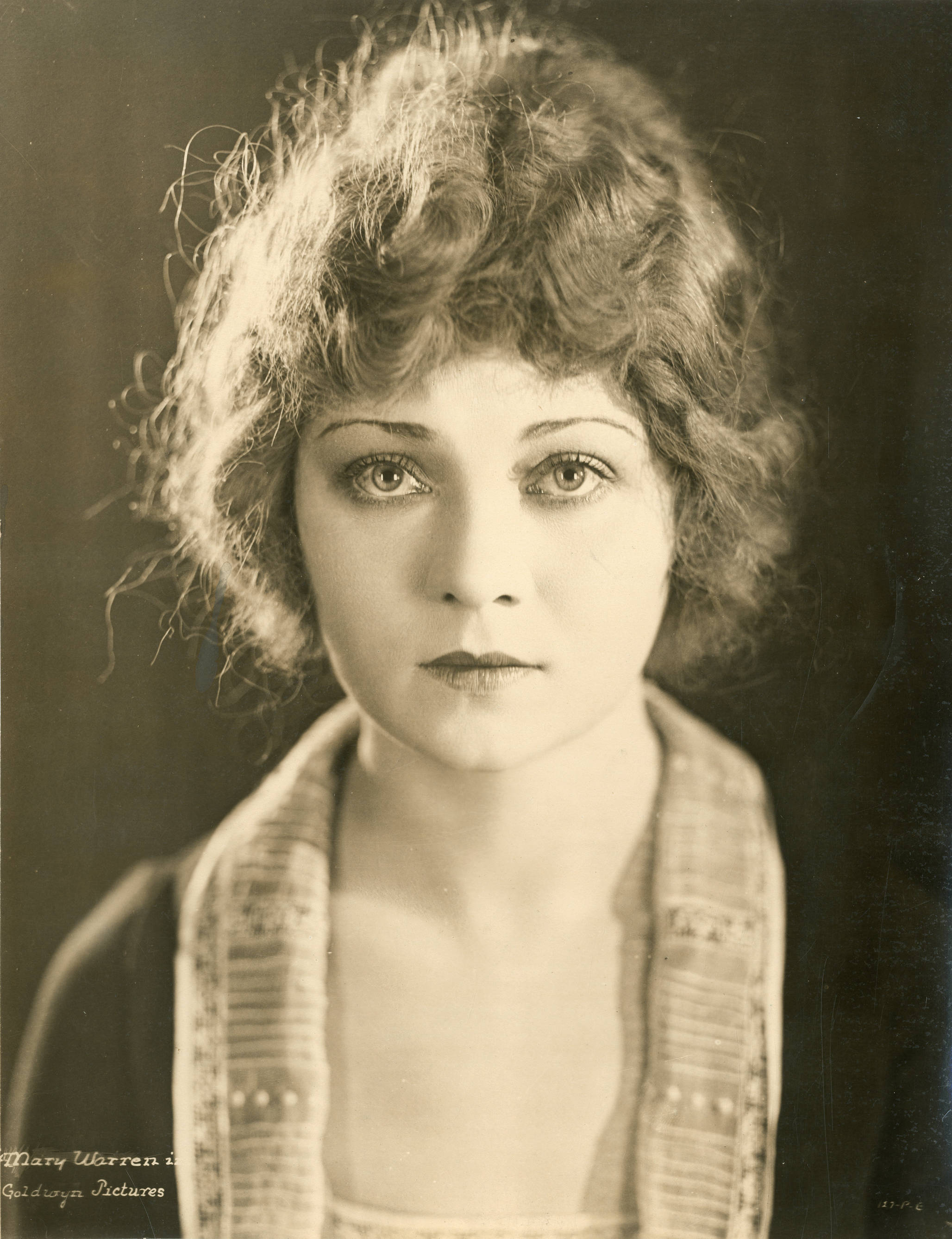
- 1920 publicity photograph
- Born: Marie Elizabeth Wierman; November 6, 1893; Philadelphia, Pennsylvania, U.S.
- Died: August 4, 1956 (aged 62); Los Angeles, California, U.S.
- Other names: Marie Wierman; Mary Warren
- Occupation: Actress
- Years active: 1912–1934
- Spouse: Lee Phelps (m. 1916; died 1953)
- Children: Marilee and Patricia

Mary Warren (1893–1956), born Marie Elizabeth Wierman, was an American actress who appeared in silent films.

== Early life ==
Marie Elizabeth Wierman was born on November 6, 1893, in Philadelphia, the daughter of Mary E. Wierman (1871–1940).

== Career ==
In 1912. Wierman was an actress working for the Lubin Manufacturing Company and a member of their number one stock company. After completing the short film Little Boy Blue released in May 1912, her stock company traveled to Portland, Maine, to film other projects.

As Mary Warren, she was an actress based in Hollywood who appeared in two dozen silent films between 1918 and 1924.

== Personal life ==
In 1916, Mary Warren married character actor Lee Phelps. They had two daughters, Marilee and Patricia.

== Death ==
Lee Phelps, 59, died on March 19, 1953, in Los Angeles, California. Mary Warren, 62, died on August 8, 1956, in Los Angeles.

== Selected filmography ==
- The Sea Panther (1918)
- The Vortex (1918)
- An Honest Man (1918)
- All Night (1918)
- What Every Woman Wants (1919)
- The Final Close-Up (1919)
- Girls (1919)
- Prudence on Broadway (1919)
- The City of Comrades (1919)
- The Prince of Avenue A (1920)
- Guile of Women (1921)
- Voices of the City (1921)
- Come on Over (1922)
- The Man Who Won (1923)
- The Wolf Man (1923)
- Cupid's Fireman (1923)
- In Love with Love (1924)
- Irish Hearts (1934)

== Bibliography ==
- Klepper, R.K. (2015). Silent Films, 1877-1996: A Critical Guide to 646 Movies. McFarland, Incorporated, Publishers. ISBN 978-1-4766-0484-8.
- Golden, E. (2013). John Gilbert: The Last of the Silent Film Stars. Screen Classics. University Press of Kentucky. ISBN 978-0-8131-4163-3.
- Motion Picture News. Motion Picture News Incorporated. 1912.
- Nickelodeon. 1918.
- Lauritzen, E.; Lundquist, G. (1976). American Film-index 1908-1915: Motion Pictures, July 1908-December 1915. Film-Index. ISBN 978-91-7410-001-3.
