= When the Earth Trembled =

1913 film by Barry O'Neil

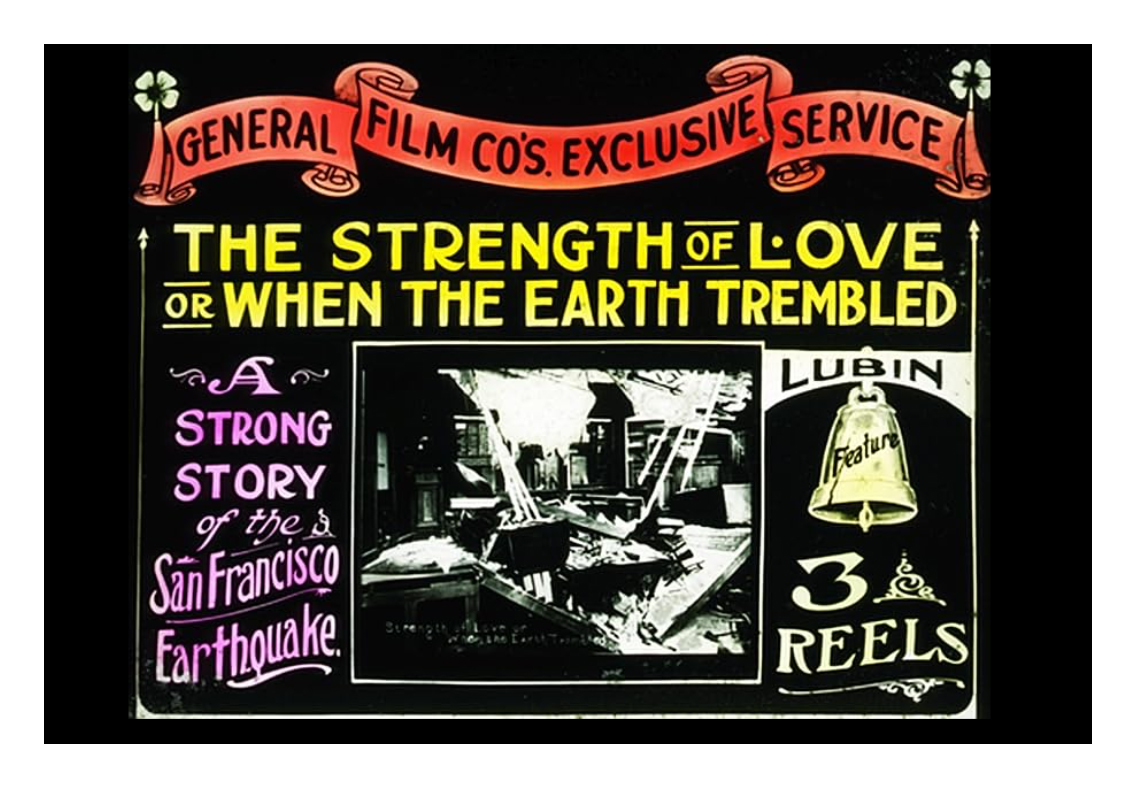
- General Film Ad
- Directed by: Barry O'Neil
- Written by: Edwin Barbour
- Produced by: Siegmund Lubin
- Starring: Ethel Clayton; Harry Myers
- Production company: Lubin Manufacturing Company
- Distributed by: General Film Company
- Release date: November 6, 1913 (San Francisco, California)
- Running time: 48 minutes, 3 reels
- Country: United States
- Languages: Silent film English intertitles

When the Earth Trembled (1913) is a silent American disaster film starring Ethel Clayton and Harry Myers. The film, a short feature, may be the first fiction film to depict the 1906 San Francisco earthquake.

Motion Picture Story Magazine (September 1913) published a story version of the screenplay by Henry Albert Phillips.

== Plot ==
When the Earth Trembled (1913)

Paul Girard Sr. is horrified to learn that his son, Paul Jr. has fallen in love with Dora Sims, the daughter of his business partner. Upon learning that his son and Dora have married, Paul cuts his son off and breaks his business dealings with Sims. Paul Jr. goes to work with his father-in-law, but unbeknownst to him, his father buys shares in the company intending to ruin the company at an opportune moment.

Years later after learning that his father is about to sell the shares, Paul Jr. acquiesces to his wishes and temporarily departs from his wife and two children. Paul's boat is shipwrecked and he is presumed dead. A grief-stricken Paul Sr. puts off selling the shares. However, an earthquake hits the city killing Sims and destroying his business. Dora sets to work providing for her family but her daughter falls ill.

Coming across a picture of his grandchildren, Paul Sr. is moved and asks his friend Pearce to hunt down the children and tell their mother he is willing to take care of them. Hearing the offer Dora is appalled and refuses, only to relent when she realizes how sick her daughter is. The children are taken to their grandfathers, where they are spoiled by all the toys and clothes they could want. Overwhelmed, Paul Sr. asks Pearce to recommend a governess for him. Pearce advises Dora to disguise herself, which she does, and she goes to work as a governess for her children, where she is very well received.

Meanwhile, Paul, who managed to survive the wreck of his ship, learns that no one has heard of his wife and children and they are presumed dead. Returning home, he goes to see Pearce, who brings him to his father. Seeing that her husband has returned, Dora reveals her true identity and is welcomed into the family by Paul Sr. who has now had the opportunity to see what a wonderful mother she is.

== Cast ==
Actor	Role
Harry Myers	Paul Girard
Ethel Clayton	Dora Sims
Bartley McCullum	William Girard
Peter Lang	John Pearce
Richard Morris	Mr. Sims
Layton Meisle	Little Boy
Mary Powers	Little Girl
Mrs. George W. Walters	Coffee Mary

== Production ==
- Director O'Neil's insistence on being as realistic as possible nearly cost Clayton her life. The actress almost died in an accident in the earthquake scene, where a chandelier fell on her.
- Four months, a then-unprecedented length of time, were required to recreate the disaster.
- Lubin Studio reused some of its own 1906 newsreel footage of the quake aftermath. Most of the Lubin newsreel footage was destroyed in a later film vault fire.

== Preservation status ==
When the Earth Trembled was long thought to be a lost film, with no prints known to exist. In 2015, the film was restored by EYE Film Institute Netherlands from three incomplete prints from the EYE Film Institute, the British Film Institute, and the Museum of Modern Art. The restored print was premiered on March 28, 2015 at Eye Filmmuseum.

On May 29, 2015, the San Francisco Silent Film Festival presented the film at the Castro Theatre in San Francisco.

== Gallery ==
The Players and Director

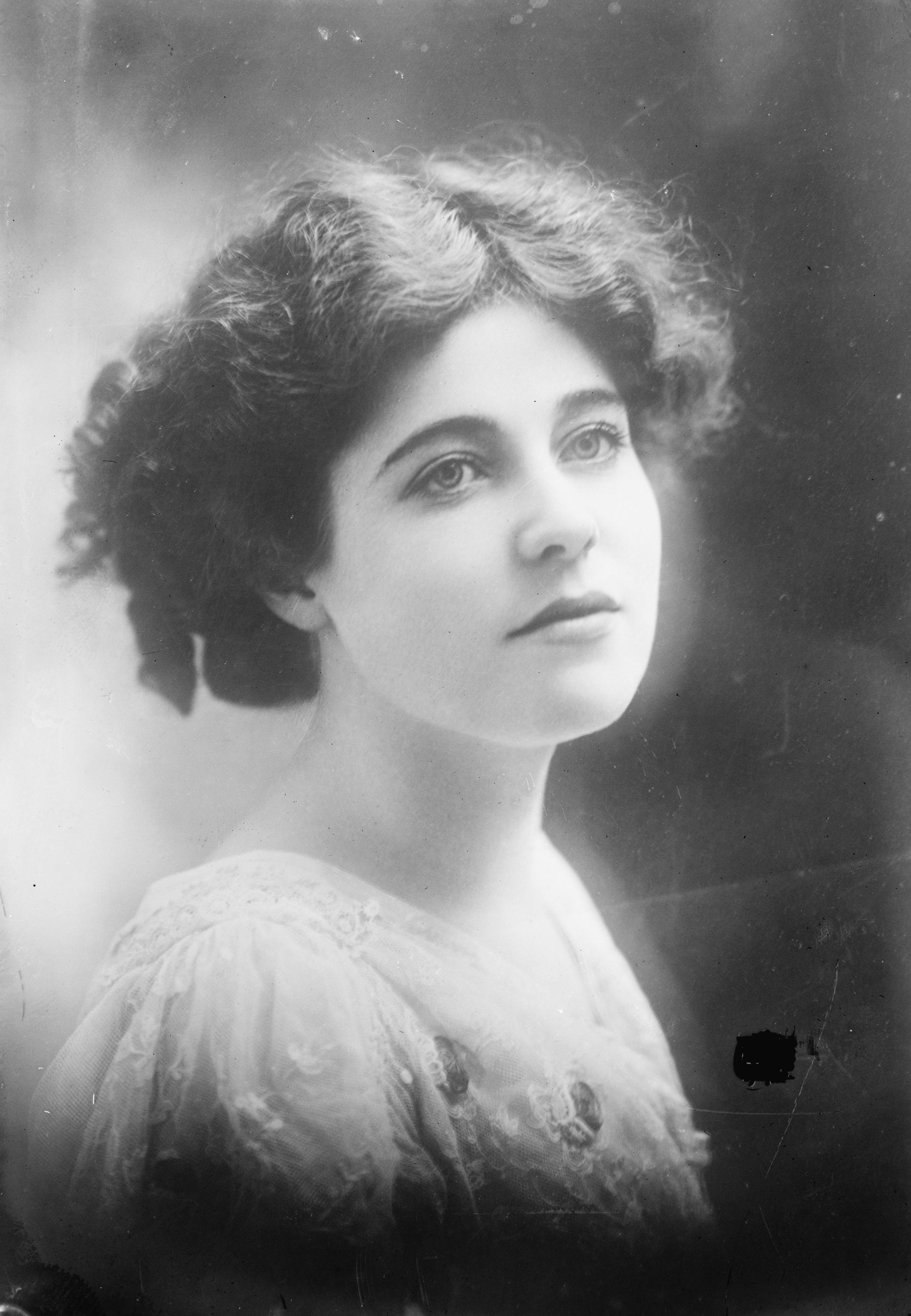
1910
Ethel Clayton

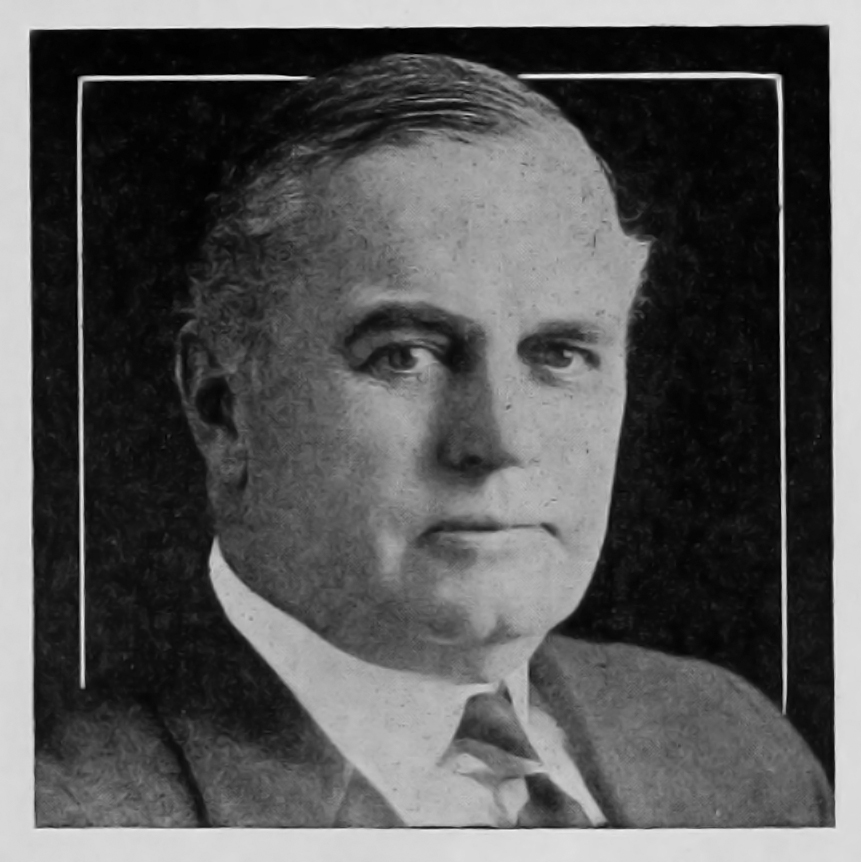
1916
Richard Morris

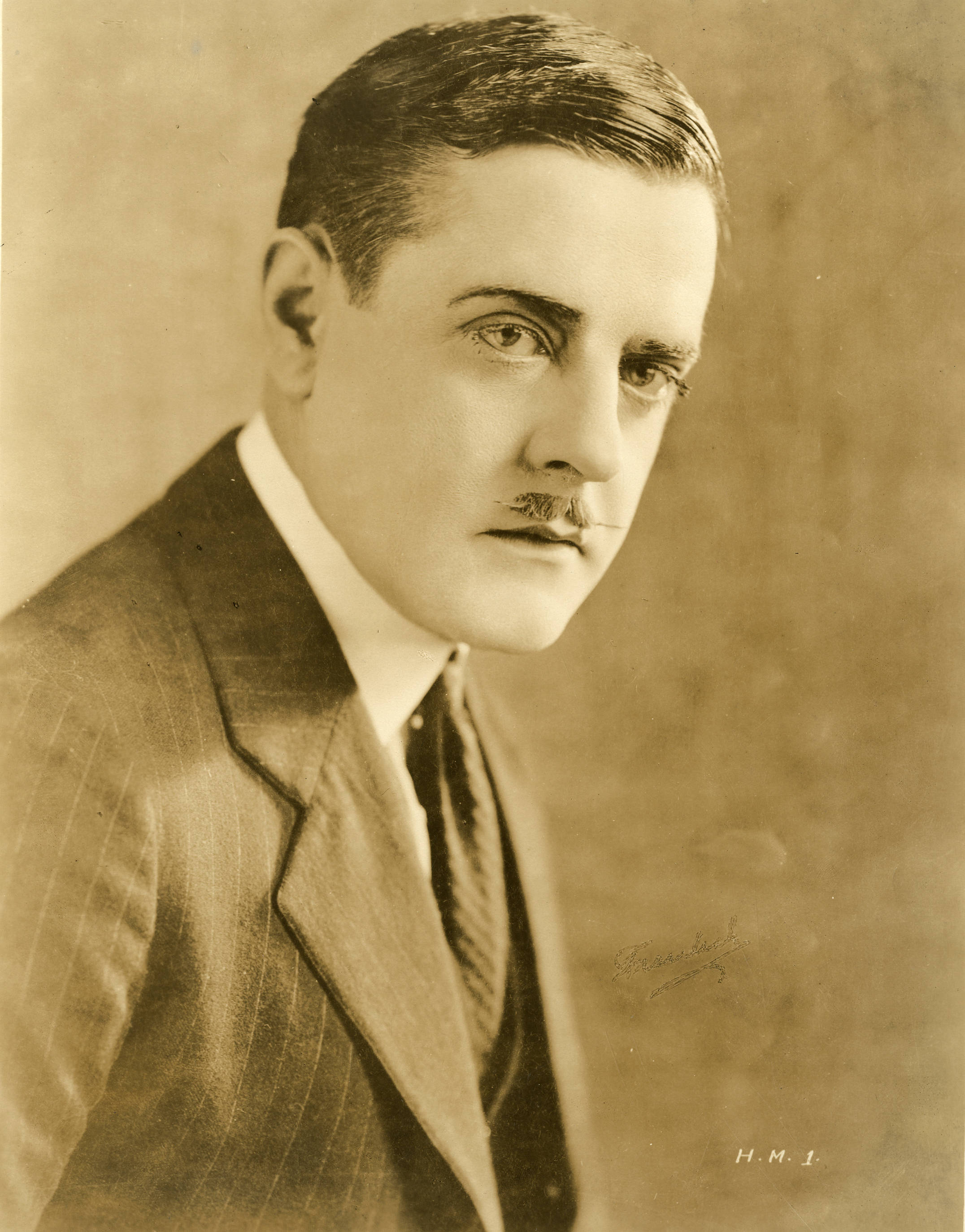
1924
Harry C. Myers

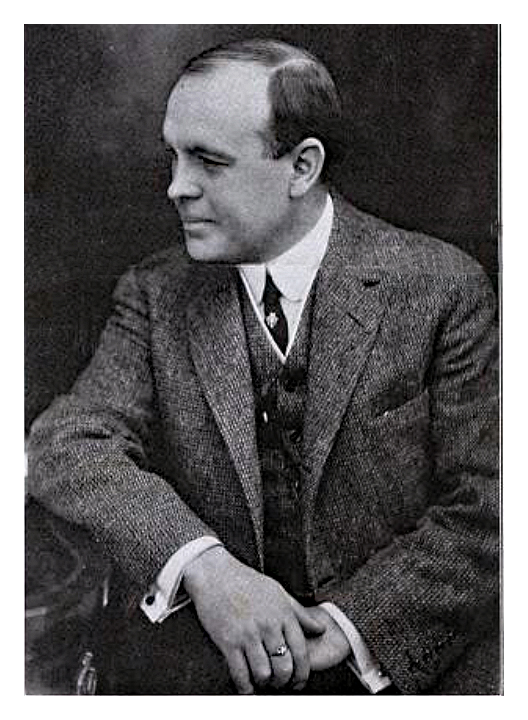
1914
Barry O'Neil
Movie Stills

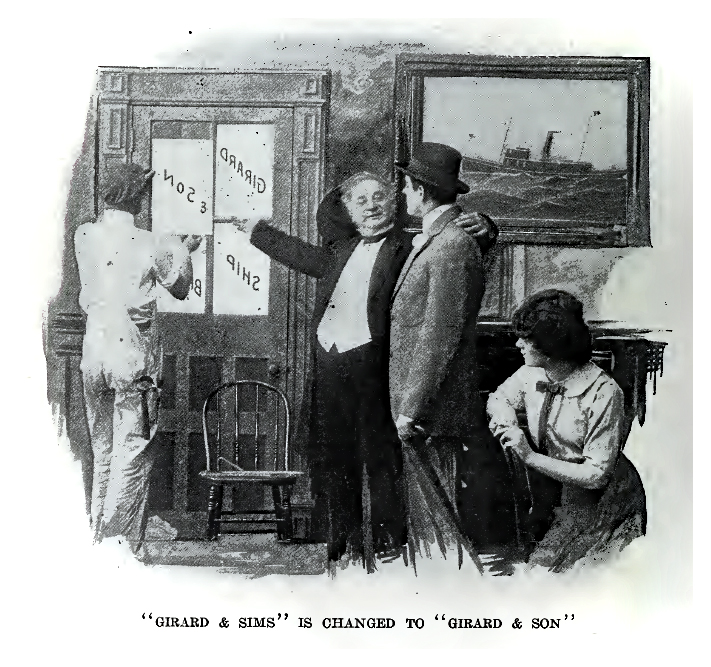

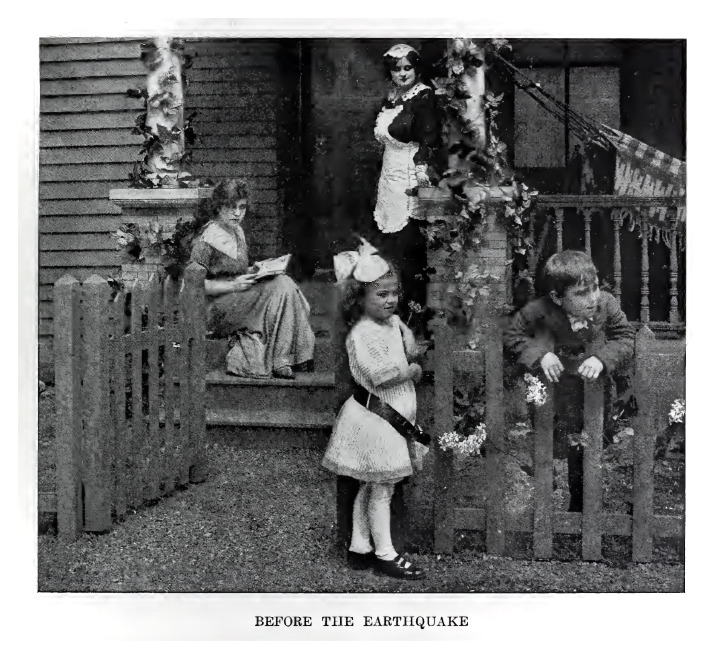

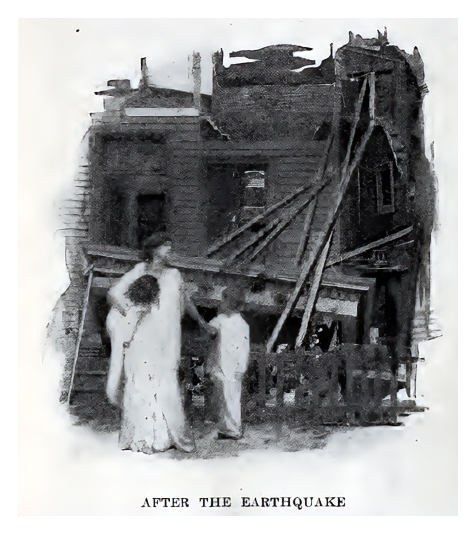

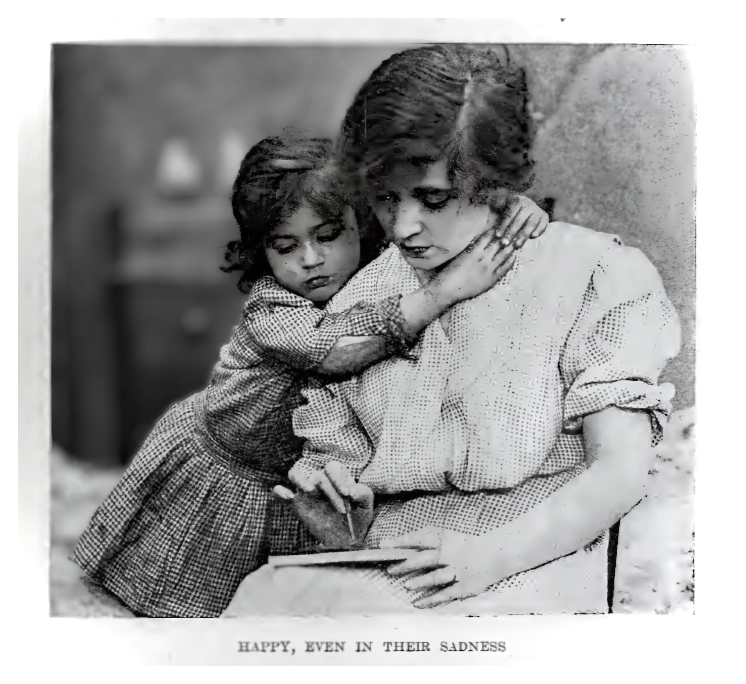

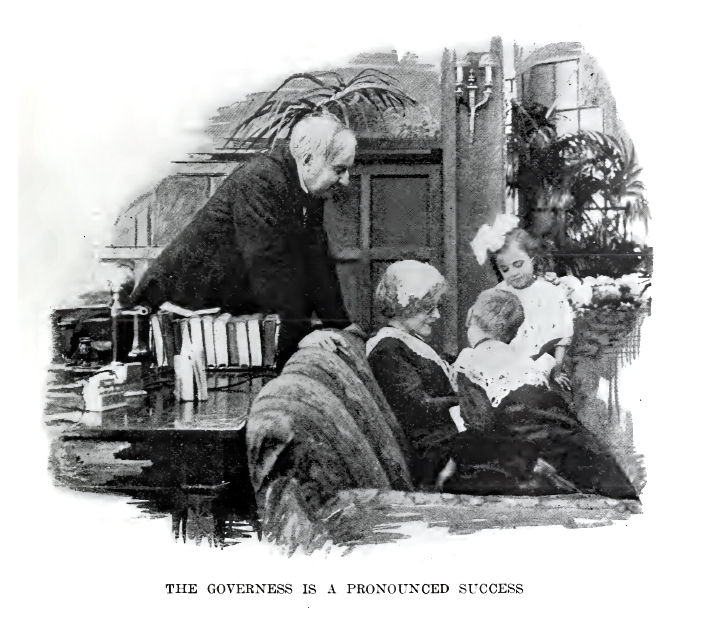

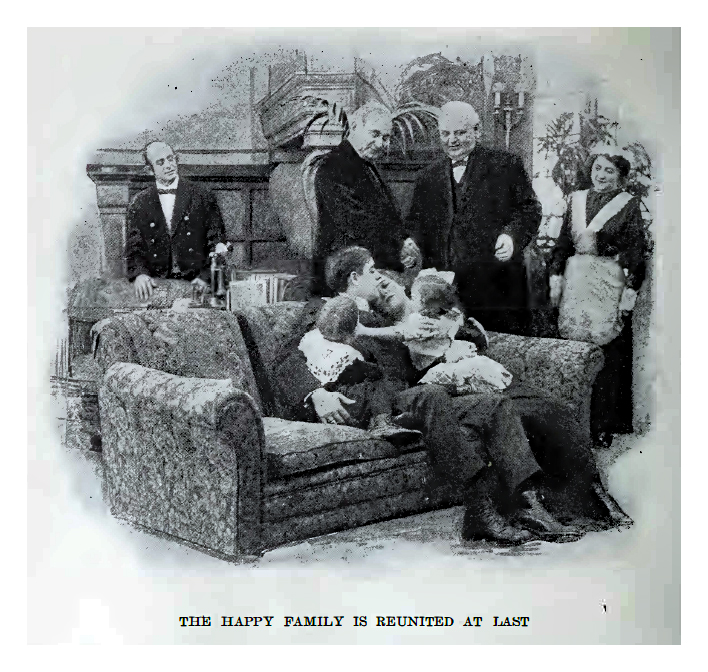
