= Black Friday (1916 film) =

Lost 1916 film directed by Lloyd Carleton

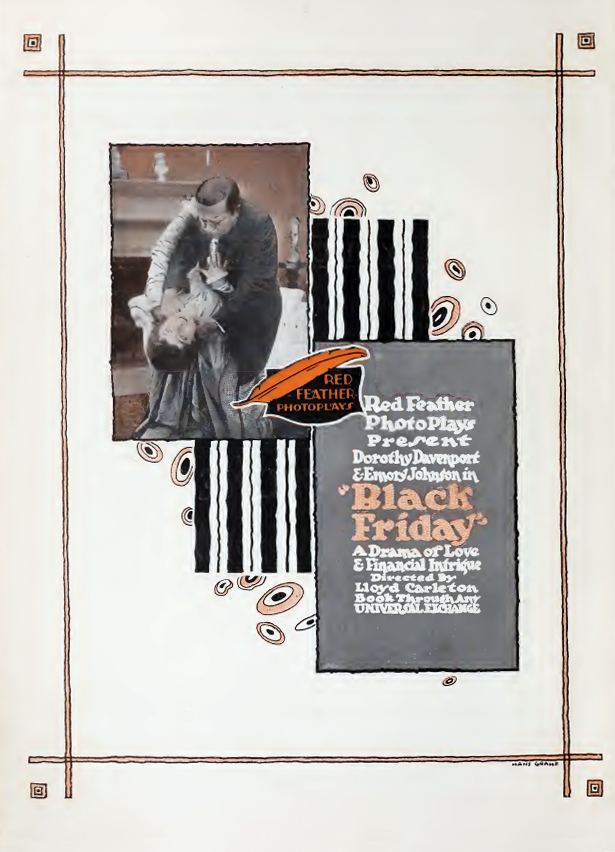
- Motion Picture News ad
- Directed by: Lloyd B. Carleton
- Written by: Frederic S. Isham
- Screenplay by: E. Magnus Ingleton
- Produced by: Red Feather
- Starring: Dorothy Davenport; Emory Johnson
- Cinematography: Roy H. Klaffki
- Distributed by: Universal
- Release date: September 18, 1916
- Running time: 50–75 minutes (5 reels)
- Country: United States
- Language: English intertitles

Black Friday was a 1916 American silent feature film directed by Lloyd B. Carleton. Universal based the film on the novel written by Frederic S. Isham and adapted for the screen by Eugenie Magnus Ingleton. The drama stars Dorothy Davenport, Emory Johnson, and a cast of Universal contract players.

The story revolves around Railroad tycoon Richard Strong. He discovers his enemies are scheming to bankrupt him. Strong enlists the help of Charles Dalton, and together they foil the plot. While working with Strong, Dalton meets Strong's wife, Elinor. Along the way, Dalton develops feelings for Elinor. Time passes, and he tries to seduce her. Elinor rejects Charles's advances and returns to Paris. Strong believes she has committed adultery but follows his wife to Paris, but they miss connections. They meet again in New York, and all ends well.

Universal released the film on September 18, 1916.

== Plot ==
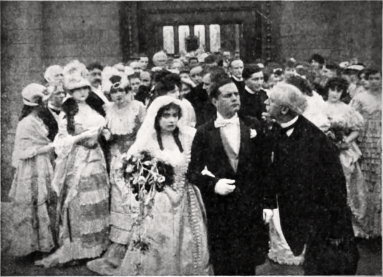

The opening scenes take place in a church. All the characters gather for the wedding of Richard Strong to Elinor Rossitor. Strong is a railroad president, known to be honest and down-to-earth. Elinor is a poor but refined visionary with dreams of wealth and status. Strong's rugged, austere nature is at odds with her warm and romantic personality, and this clash of temperaments will come back to haunt them in the future. The ceremony takes place; they wed the two, and the new couple plans a romantic honeymoon in Paris.

Rivals of Richard Strong are attempting to ruin him financially. When he leaves on his honeymoon, his enemies will carry out their scheme. They plan to issue false reports about dealings with his companies. They also plan to corner the gold market. The plan's details include bribing certain Washington officials, inducing them to send a fake telegram to President Grant. The telegram will implore the President to leave Washington to attend an event. Thus, in his absence, he cannot order the sale of gold.

One of Strong's clerks overhears part of the plan. While Strong and his wife are getting ready to leave on their honeymoon, the clerk gives him a tip about the nefarious undertakings of his rivals. Strong believes the threats are spurious and ignores the warnings. They depart for Paris.

While in Paris, more telegrams arrive, and Strong can no longer ignore the threats. He must return home. This widens the emotional chasm between Strong and his wife. After all, he is heading back to New York in the middle of their honeymoon. The couple embarks on their trip to New York. His clandestine return to New York works, and he arrives before his enemies even suspect his return.

With the help of Charles Dalton, he thwarts their plans. As a reward, Strong hires Dalton to be his assistant. While working with Strong, Dalton becomes acquainted with his wife. She becomes friendly with Dalton, and he gives her the emotional support she so desperately needs. One night, things go too far, and he tries to seduce her. She rebuffs him, and they both go their separate ways. Elinor refuses to see Dalton anymore. Dalton is craving some emotional connection and yields to the charms of his wife, Zoldene. The couple had separated when she found out he had no money.

In the meantime, Strong discovers what he thinks is the affair his wife was having with Dalton. He accuses them both of adultery. He becomes estranged from both.

Elinor decides she must escape all the intrigue at home. Along with her father, Edwin, she returns to Paris. Her father's health is fading. Strong and President Grant schedule a meeting. They met, and afterward, the President directs the Treasury to sell gold. The move shreds the last glimmers of hope for his enemies. The gold-selloff makes millions for Strong.

Edwin Rossitor's health worsens in Paris, and he wants to return to the states. Elinor wants to help him return, but she worries about the danger posed by the riots associated with the Paris Commune. Edwin wires Strong and asks him to travel to Paris to help them. When Strong arrives in France, he can find no trace of either party.

One night, as he watches a mob, he finds out Elinor is the center of the disturbance. He tries to rescue her but ends up unconscious in an alley. Later, in his hotel room, he regains his senses. Elinor is nowhere to be found.

Charles Dalton and Zoldene are also in Paris at the same time. Dalton asks Strong to pay him and his wife a visit. He swears to Strong nothing ever happened between him and his wife, Elinor. This time, Dalton convinces Strong he is telling the truth.

Strong walks away from the talk, relieved, but now believes Elinor no longer cares for him. He sadly returns to New York alone. He pays a visit to the old address and takes one last glimpse of the home to his strained marriage. As chance would have it, Elinor was also passing by the home searching for memories. They see each other, they pause, their eyes meet, and he tells her he will always love her. She looks deeper into his eyes and tells him she never stopped loving him. It rekindled their romance; they walk off hand-in-hand.

== Cast ==
Actor	Role
Richard Morris	Richard Strong (Railroad President)
Dorothy Davenport	Elinor Rossitor (Richard Strong's wife)
Emory Johnson	Charles Dalton (Richard Strong's friend)
Mary Maurice	Mrs. Rossitor (Elinor's mother)
Wilfred Rogers	Edwin Rossitor (Elinor's father)
Gretchen Lederer	Zoldene (Dalton's wife)
Mark Fenton	Jim Fisk
Edith Hallor	Isabelle Hamlin / Rose Hamlin
Virginia Southern	Posie Stanton

== Production ==
=== Pre production ===
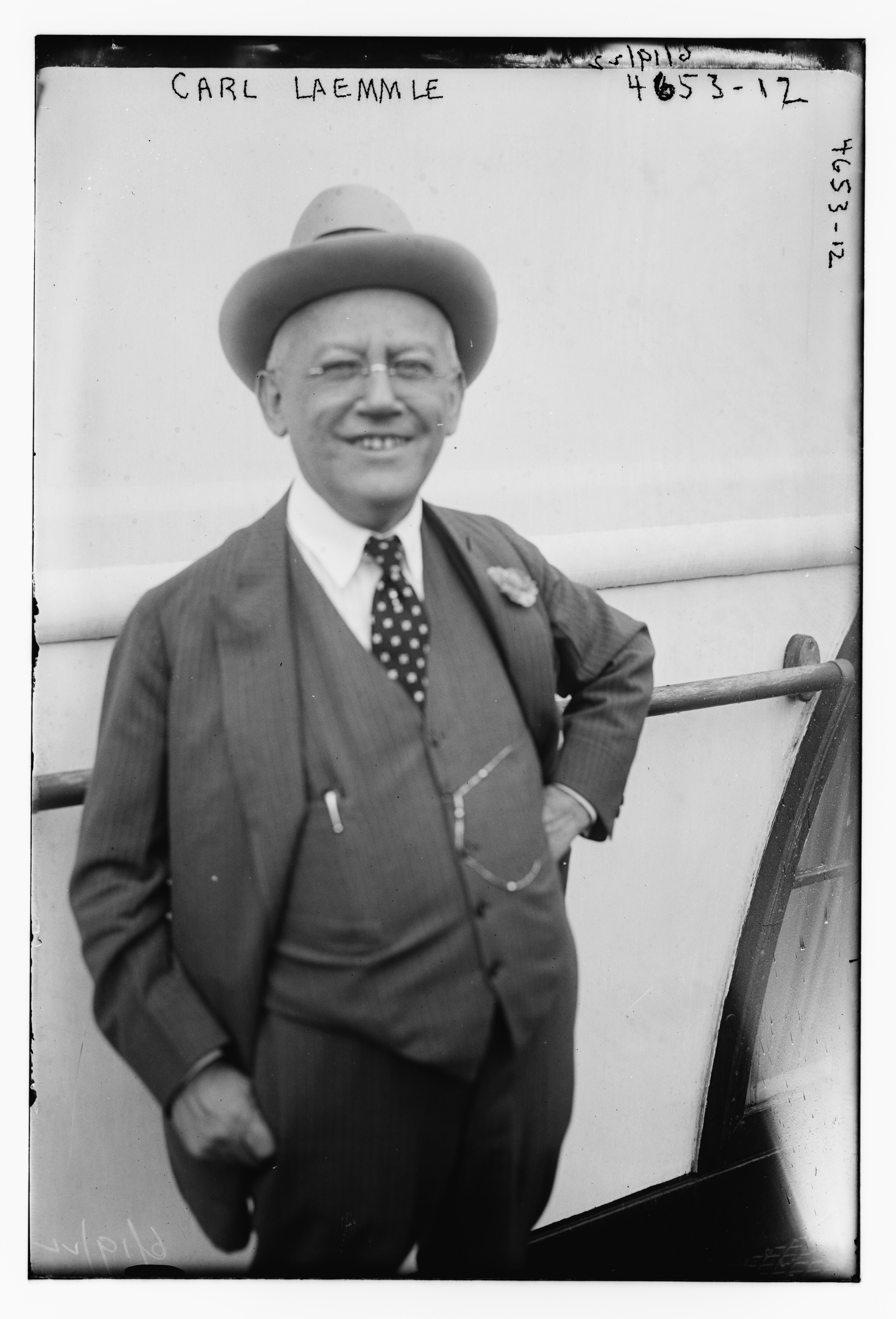
Carl Laemmle in 1918

Universal Logo 1915

In the book, "American Cinema's Transitional Era," the authors point out, The years between 1908 and 1917 witnessed what may have been the most significant transformation in American film history. During this "transitional era", widespread changes affected film form and film genres, filmmaking practices and industry structure, exhibition sites, and audience demographics. One aspect of this transition was the longer duration of films. Feature films (Note: A "feature film" or "feature-length film" is a narrative film (motion picture or "movie") with a running time long enough to be considered the principal or sole presentation in a commercial entertainment program. A film can be distributed as a feature film if it equals or exceeds a specified minimum running time and satisfies other defined criteria. The minimum time depends on the governing agency. The American Film Institute and the British Film Institute require films to have a minimum running time of forty minutes or longer. Other film agencies, e.g.,Screen Actors Guild, require a film's running time to be 60 minutes or greater. Currently, most feature films are between 70 and 210 minutes long.) were slowly becoming the standard fare for Hollywood producers. Before 1913, you could count the yearly features on two hands. Between 1915 and 1916, the number of feature movies rose 2 1/2 times or from 342 films to 835. There was a recurring claim that Carl Laemmle was the longest-running studio chief resisting the production of feature films. Universal was not ready to downsize its short film business because short films were cheaper, faster, and more profitable to produce than feature films. (Note: " Short Film" - There are no defined parameters for a Short film except for one immutable rule -the film's maximum running time. The Academy of Motion Picture Arts and Sciences defines a short film as "an original motion picture that has a running time of 40 minutes or less, including all credits".)

Laemmle would continue to buck this trend while slowly increasing his output of features. In 1914, Laemmle published an essay titled - Doom of long Features Predicted. In 1916, Laemmle ran an advertisement extolling Bluebird films while adding the following vocabulary on the top of the ad. (Note: The moving picture business is here to stay. That you must admit, despite carping critics and blundering sore-heads, true, some exhibitors have found business so good lately — but if you get down to facts when you look for a reason why, it's a 100 to 1 shot that they are, and for some time have been, dallying with a feature program. Some of these wise ones will tell you that business has picked up since they went into features, — BUT — ask them whether they are talking NET or GROSS. They will find they have an immediate appointment and terminate your queries unceremoniously. Funny how we like to kid ourselves, isn't it? The man who is packing 'em in and losing money on features is envied by his competitor, who is laying by a bit every day, and has a good steady, dependable patronage but admits to a few vacant seats at some performances. When this chap wakes up, he will realize that he has a gold mine and that good advertising will make it produce to capacity. The moral is that if you can tie up to the Universal Program, DO IT. If you can't NOW, watch your first chance. Let the people know what you have, and let the feature man go on to ruin if he wants to. You should worry! Motion Picture News - May 6, 1916) Universal made 91 feature films in 1916, including 44 Bluebirds and 47 Red Feather productions.

This film was labeled with Universal's Red Feather brand, indicating it was a low-budget feature film.

==== Development ====
Black Friday is set during the presidency of Ulysses S. Grant. Grant was the 18th president of the United States, serving from 1869 to 1877. The movie title is based on the Black Friday scandal that initiated the gold panic of 1869. The actual date for Black Friday was Friday, September 24, 1869, when President Grant started selling Treasury gold at weekly intervals to pay off the national debt, stabilize the dollar, and boost the economy. This movie is also a period piece taking place during the Gilded Age.

==== Casting ====
All players in this film were under contract with Universal.

- Dorothy Davenport (1895–1977) was an established star for Universal when the 21 year-old actress played the Elionor Rossitor. She had acted in hundreds of movies by the time she starred in this film. The majority of these films were 2-reel shorts, as was the norm in Hollywood's teen years. She had been making movies since 1910. She started dating Wally Reid when she was barely 16, and he was 20. They married in 1913. After her husband died in 1923, she used the name "Mrs. Wallace Reid" in the credits for any project she took part in. Besides being an actress, she would eventually become a film director, producer, and writer.
- Emory Johnson (1894–1960) was 22 years old when he starred in this movie as Charles Dalton. In January 1916, Emory signed a contract with Universal Film Manufacturing Company. Carl Laemmle of Universal Film Manufacturing Company thought he saw great potential in Johnson, so he chooses him to be Universal's new leading man. Laemmle's hope was Johnson would become another Wallace Reed. A major part of his plan was to create a movie couple that would sizzle on the silver screen. Laemmle thought Dorothy Davenport and Emory Johnson could create the chemistry he sought. Johnson and Davenport would complete 14 films together. They started with the successful feature production of "Doctor Neighbor" in May 1916 and ended with "The Devil's Bondwoman" in November 1916. After completing the last movie, Laemmle thought Johnson did not have the screen presence he wanted. He decided not to renew his contract. Johnson would make 17 movies in 1916, including 6 shorts and 11 feature-length Dramas. 1916 would become the second-highest movie output of his entire acting career. Emory acted in 25 films for Universal, mostly dramas with a sprinkling of comedies and westerns.
- Gretchen Lederer (1891–1955) was a 25 year-old actress when she landed this role as Zoldene. Lederer was a German actress getting her first start in 1912 with Carl Laemmle. At the time of this film, she was still a Universal contract actress. She had previously acted in two Bosworth-Johnson projects preceding this movie - The Yaqui and Two Men of Sandy Bar. She would unite with Emory Johnson in the 1916 productions of A Yoke of Gold and The Morals of Hilda.
- Richard Morris (1862–1924) was a 54 year-old actor when he played Richard Strong. He was a character actor and former opera singer known for Granny (1913). He would eventually participate in many Johnson projects, including |In the Name of the Law (1922), The Third Alarm (1922), The West~Bound Limited (1923), The Mailman (1923) until his untimely death in 1924.
- Edith Hallor (1896–1971) was an 20 year-old actress when she played the part of Isabelle Hamlin. She was an American stage and film actress and starred in several films during the silent era. She was active during 1914–1945.
- Mary Maurice (1844–1918) was 71 year-old actress when she landed the role of Mrs. Rossitor. After a long and distinguished stage career supporting many of the same touring companies that employed Richard Morris, she appeared in 150 films between 1909 and 1918, frequently playing mothers or grandmothers.
- Mark Fenton (1866–1925) was an 49 year-old actor when he was cast as Jim Fisk. James Fisk was an actual historical character involved in the Black Friday scandal. Fenton appeared in 80 films between 1914 and 1925 before his untimely death in Los Angeles. Fenton was also a stage performer, similar to many of the players and the Director of this film.
- Wilfred Rogers (c. 1882-1917) was a 34 actor when he played the role of Edwin Rossitor. He acted primarily in silent films and was also another speaking stage convert.

==== Director ====
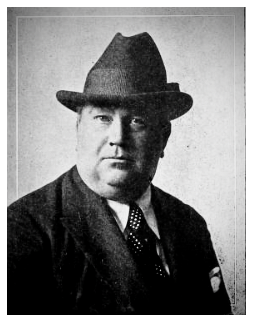
Director Lloyd B. Carleton

Lloyd B. Carleton (c. 1872–1933) started working for Carl Laemmle in the Fall of 1915. Carleton arrived with impeccable credentials, having directed some 60 films for the likes of Thanhouser, Lubin, Fox, and Selig.

Between March and December 1916, 44-year-old Lloyd Carleton directed 16 movies for Universal, starting with The Yaqui and ending with The Morals of Hilda released on December 11, 1916. Emory Johnson acted in all 16 of these films. Of Carleton's total 1916 output, 11 were feature films, and the rest were two-reel shorts. After Emory Johnson signed his Universal contract in early 1916, Carl Laemmle, the owner of Universal Pictures, thought he had found a new leading man. Laemmle was looking for a male lead like Wallace Reid. He also wanted to develop a cinematic pair that would captivate audiences.

Johnson became Laemmle's choice for his new leading man. Laemmle chose Dorothy Davenport to spark screen chemistry with Johnson. She was a Universal contract player who was Wallace Reid's wife. Universal's top director, Lloyd B. Carleton, was tasked by Laemmle to direct all of this pair's films.

The collaboration of Johnson and Davenport resulted in 13 films, beginning with the release of Doctor Neighbor in May 1916. The last film in the series was The Devil's Bondwoman, released in November 1916. The majority of the movies were feature films. All the films featured Johnson and Davenport as the main stars.

Davenport became pregnant in October 1916, and her film output dropped sharply in early 1917. In the end, Laemmle felt Johnson was not talented nor charismatic enough. He would not be Universal's version of Wally Reid. Laemmle felt that the films needed more screen chemistry, even if they made money. In June 1918, Universal failed to renew the contract of Emory Johnson.

The table below lists the 13 films Johnson and Davenport collaborated on.

◆ Films starring Emory Johnson and Dorothy Davenport in 1916 ◆
Title	Released	Director	Davenport role	Johnson role	Type	Time	LOC	Brand	Notes
Doctor Neighbor	1 May	Carleton	Hazel Rogers	Hamilton Powers	Drama	Feature	lost	Red Feather	
Her Husband's Faith	11 May	Carleton	Mabel Otto	Richard Otto	Drama	Short	lost	Universal	
Heartaches	18 May	Carleton	Virginia Payne	S Jackson Hunt	Drama	Short	lost	Universal	
Two Mothers	1 Jun	Carleton	Violetta Andree	2nd Husband	Drama	Short	lost	Universal	
Her Soul's Song	15 Jun	Carleton	Mary Salsbury	Paul Chandos	Drama	Short	lost	Universal	
The Way of the World	3 Jul	Carleton	Beatrice Farley	Walter Croyden	Drama	Feature	lost	Red Feather	
No. 16 Martin Street	13 Jul	Carleton	Cleo	Jacques Fournier	Drama	Short	lost	Universal	
A Yoke of Gold	14 Aug	Carleton	Carmen	Jose Garcia	Drama	Feature	lost	Red Feather	
The Unattainable	4 Sep	Carleton	Bessie Gale	Robert Goodman	Drama	Feature	1 of 5 reels	Bluebird	
Black Friday	18 Sep	Carleton	Elionor Rossitor	Charles Dalton	Drama	Feature	lost	Red Feather	
The Human Gamble	8 Oct	Carleton	Flavia Hill	Charles Hill	Drama	Short	lost	Universal	
Barriers of Society	10 Oct	Carleton	Martha Gorham	Westie Phillips	Drama	Feature	1 of 5 reels	Red Feather	
The Devil's Bondwoman	11 Nov	Carleton	Beverly Hope	Mason Van Horton	Drama	Feature	lost	Red Feather	

==== Screenplay ====
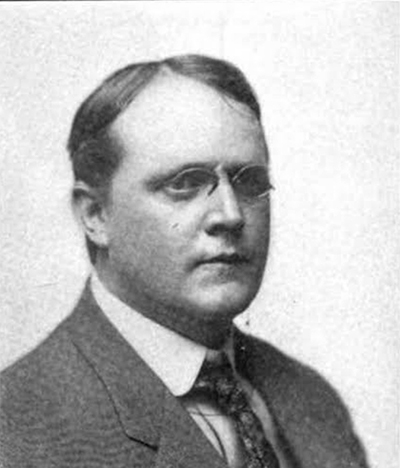
Frederic S. Isham
1905

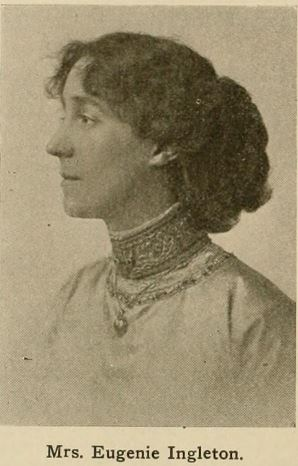
Eugenie Ingleton
1915

The story for this movie was based on the novel "Black Friday" by Frederic S. Isham (1865–1922). He was 38 years old when he published Black Friday and 51 when it was released as a film.

The storyline for the novel was rooted in the American financial crisis of 1869. The book was published in Indianapolis in 1904 and the movie was produced by arrangement with the novel's publisher, Bobbs-Merrill Company

The story was scenarioized by Mrs. E. Magnus Ingleton (c. 1873-1936). She was 43 years old when she created the screen adaption for this film. She was a British screenwriter, actress, and war correspondent.

=== Post production ===
The theatrical release of this film totaled five reels or 5,000 feet of film. As is often the case, the listed time for this feature-length movie varies. The average time per 1,000-foot 35mm reel varied between ten and fifteen minutes per reel at the time. Thus, the total time for this movie is computed between fifty and seventy-five minutes.

==== Studios ====
The interiors were filmed in the studio complex at Universal Studios located at 100 Universal City Plaza in Universal City, California. Universal produced and distributed this film.

== Release and reception ==
=== Official release ===
The copyright was filed with U.S. Copyright Office on August 26, 1916, and entered in the record as shown: (Note: The copyright was filed with U.S. Copyright Office and entered in the record as shown. BLACK FRIDAY. Red Feather. 1916 5 reels. From the book by Frederic S. Isham Credits: Producer, Lyold B. Carleton; adaptation E. M. Ingleton © Universal Film Mfg. Co., Inc.; 26Aug16; LP9003)

In 1916, "Red Feather" movies were always released on Mondays. This film was officially released on Monday, September 18, 1916.

=== Advertising ===
In 1916, Universal became the first Hollywood studio to classify feature films based on production cost. One of the reasons behind this move was that the Big Five film studios owned their own movie houses, enabling them to have guaranteed outlets for their entertainment products. Unlike the majors, Universal did not own any theaters or theater chains. Branding all Universal-produced feature films would give theater owners another tool to judge the films they were about to lease and help fans decide which movies they wanted to see. (Note: Universal formed a three-tier branding system for their feature films based on the size of their budget and status. In the book "The Universal Story," the author Clive Hirschhorn describes the feature movie branding as: Red Feather Photoplays – low-budget feature films; Bluebird Photoplays – mainstream feature release and more ambitious productions; Jewel – prestige motion pictures featuring high budgets using prominent actors; In 1917, the Butterfly line, a grade between Red Feather and Bluebird, was introduced. During the following two years, half of Universal's feature film output was in the Red Feather and Butterfly categories. However, this was during a time when stars increasingly took the spotlight in advertising. The branding tags seemly ignored that the ticket-buying audience attended movies to see their favorite stars, not the vehicle allowing them to perform.)

In 1916, Universal produced 91 branded feature films, consisting of 44 Bluebirds and 47 Red Feather productions. The branding system had a brief existence and, by 1920, had faded away.

This film was the 34th release carrying the designation of Universal's "Red Feather" brand.

=== Reviews ===
The movie critic's reviews of the photoplay were mixed.

In the September 9, 1916 issue of The Moving Picture World, movie critic Robert C. McElravy reviewed the film:

While not adequately handled in the matter of clear and consistent direction, the production maintains a strong interest and has much about it to commend. From the very first scenes, when the characters are introduced at a church wedding, one can feel the beginnings of a story of consequence, and this feeling grows as the action continues. The story as a whole has not a great deal of dramatic strength, but gets away from the beaten path and has the advantage of a pleasing historical background.

In the August 31, 1916 issue of the Wids, the magazine reviewer states:

The story is not particularly powerful and at times is slow with the ultimate ending rather obvious, yet the novel atmosphere will help to carry it through. As a whole, this production will undoubtedly satisfy any average audience because of the unusual atmosphere of it all. It is not an exceptional film, and, in fact, it has many weak spots, but your patrons will come out and say that it was good.

== Preservation status ==
Many silent-era films did not survive for reasons as explained on this Wikipedia page. (Note: Film is history. With every foot of film lost, we lose a link to our culture, the world around us, each other, and ourselves. – Martin Scorsese, filmmaker, director NFPF Board A report by Library of Congress film historian and archivist David Pierce estimates that: around 75% of original silent-era films have perished; 14% of the 10,919 silent films released by major studios exist in their original 35 mm or other formats; 11% survive only in full-length foreign versions or film formats of lesser image quality.)

According to the Library of Congress, all known copies of this film are lost.

== Gallery ==
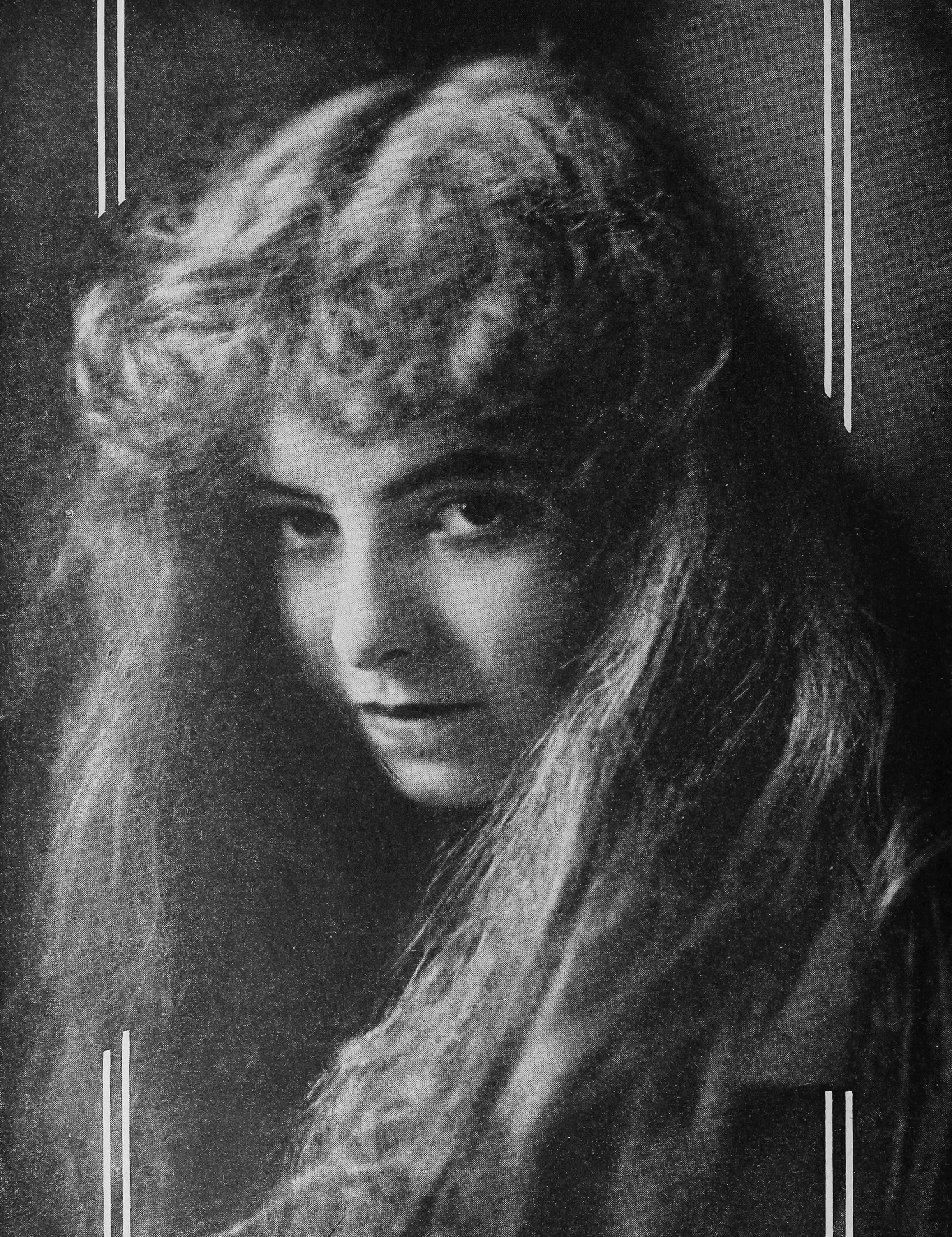
Dorothy Davenport 1914
Elionor Rossitor

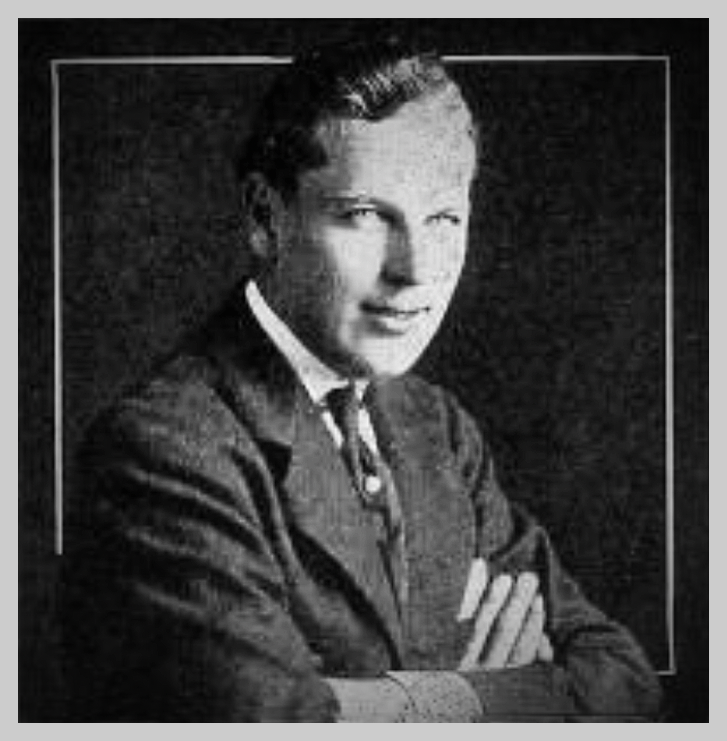
Emory Johnson 1916
Charles Dalton

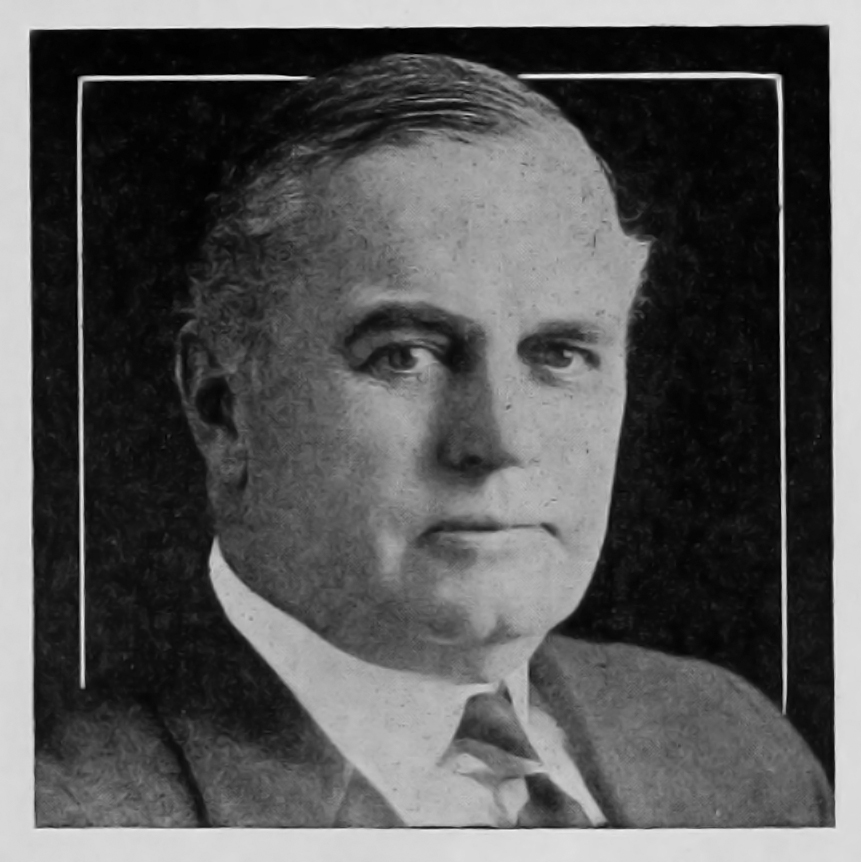
Richard Morris 1916
Richard Strong

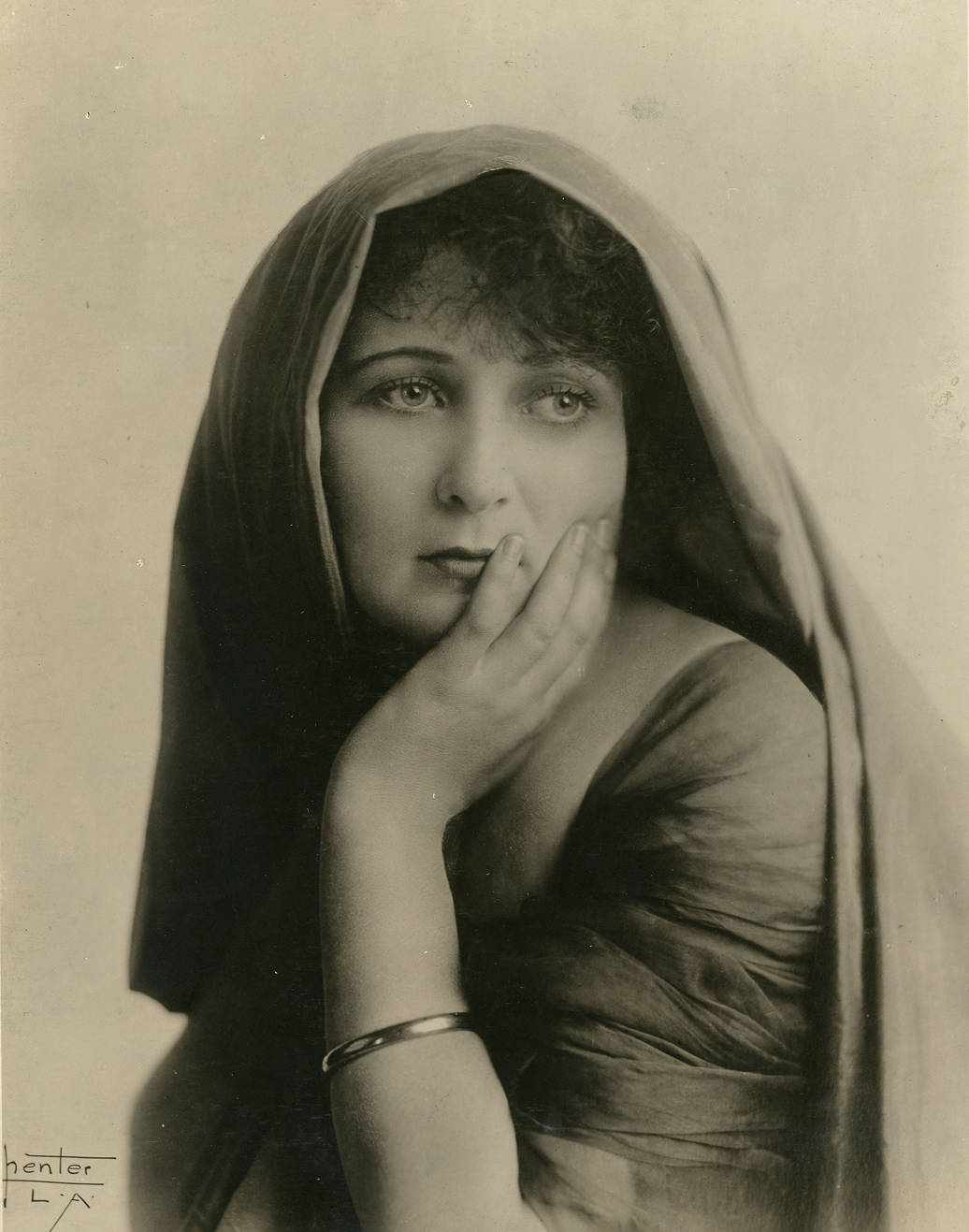
Gretchen Lederer 1924
Zoldene

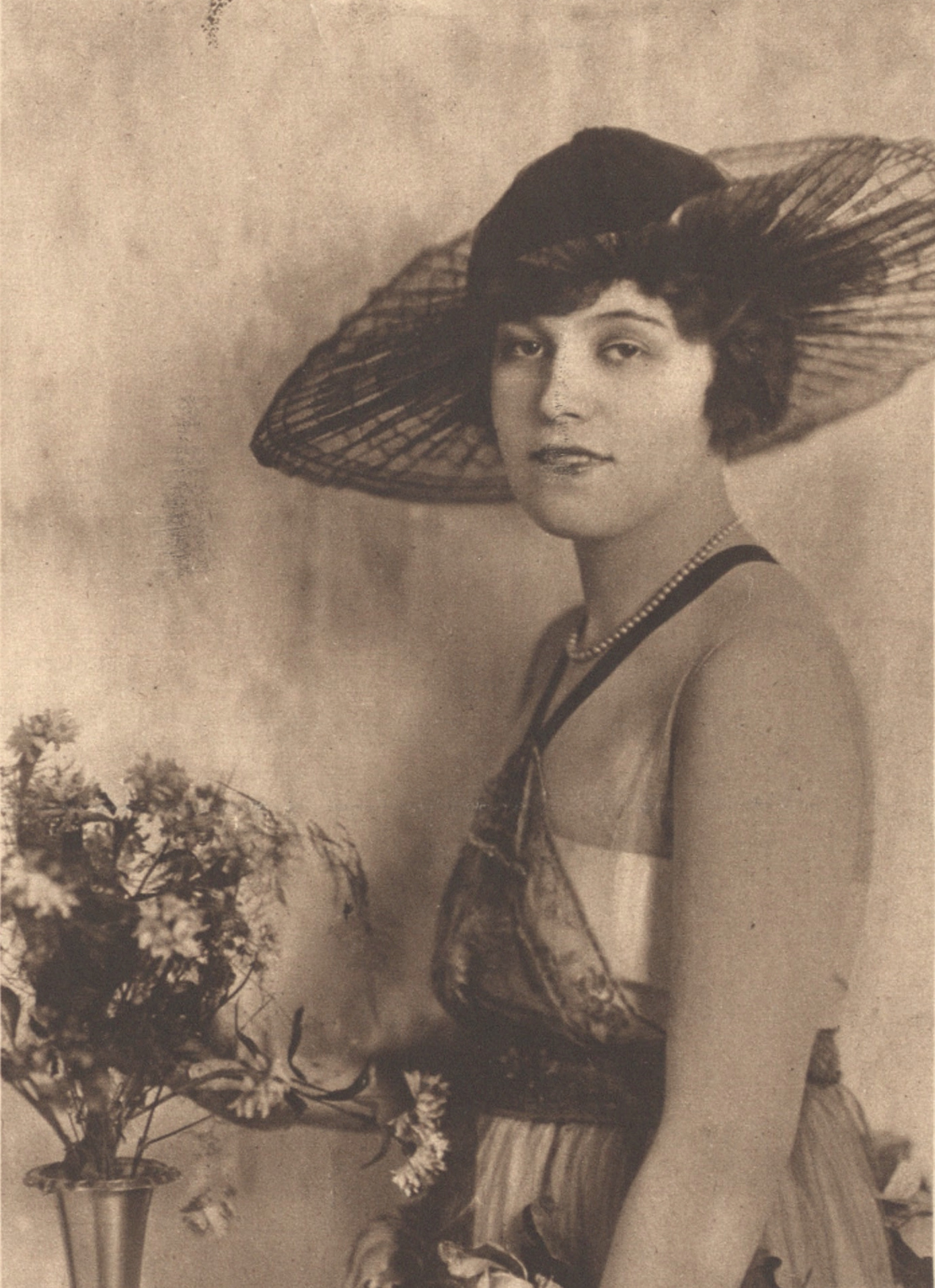
Edith Hallor
Isabelle (Rose) Hamlin

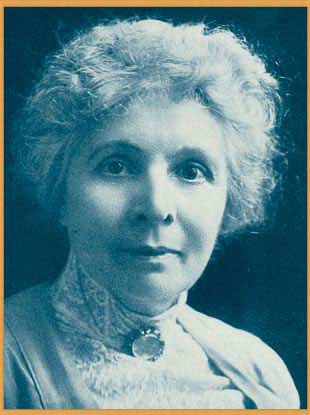
Mary Maurice 1916
Mrs. Rossitor

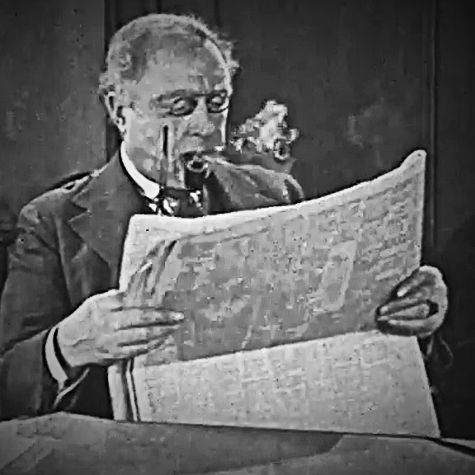
Mark Fenton 1916
Jim Fisk

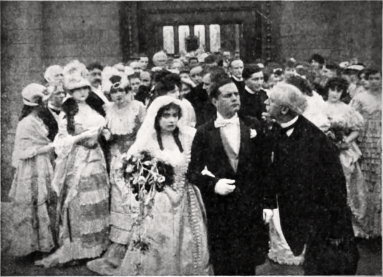
Richard and Elinor marriage

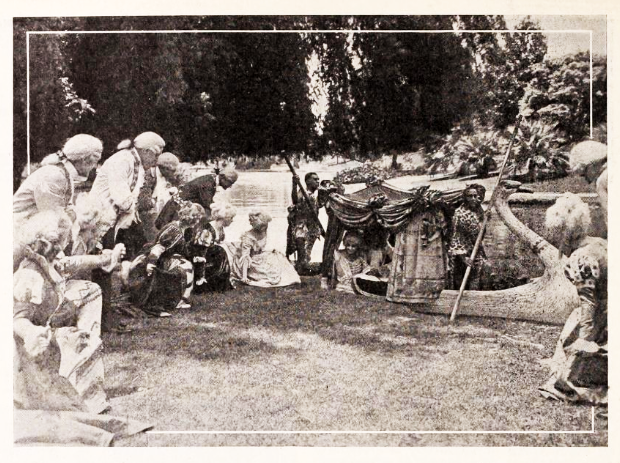
Spending time in Paris

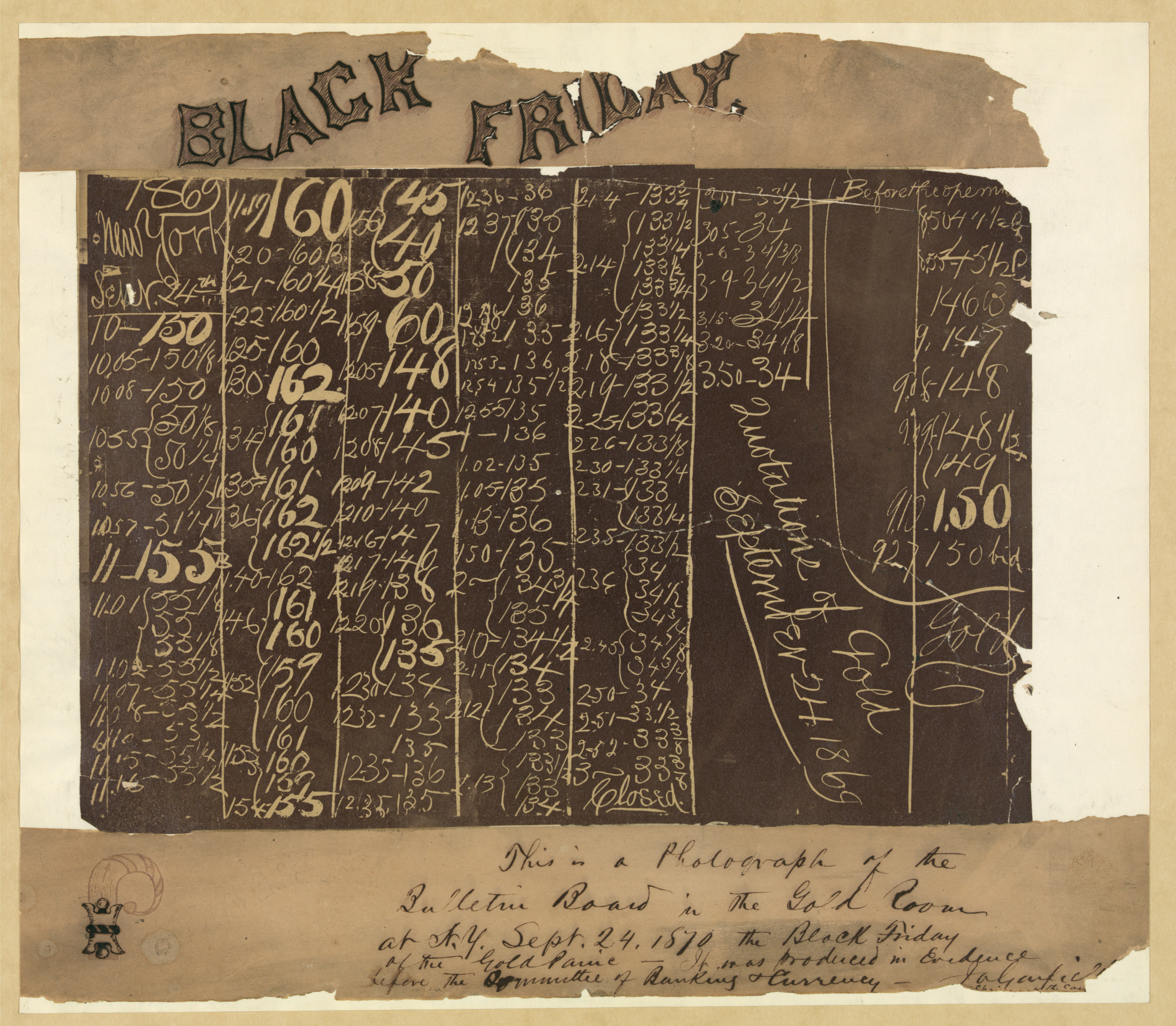
1869 Photo showing collapse of gold price

== Sources ==
- Braff, R.E. (1999). The Universal Silents: A Filmography of the Universal Motion Picture Manufacturing Company, 1912-1929. McFarland. ISBN 978-0-7864-0287-8.
- Fleming, E.J. (2010). Wallace Reid: The Life and Death of a Hollywood Idol. McFarland. ISBN 978-0-7864-8266-5.
- Hirschhorn, Clive (1983). The Universal Story - The Complete History of the Studio and its 2,641 films. New York: Crown Publishing Group. pp. 22–23. ISBN 0-517-55001-6.
- Keil, C.; Stamp, S. (2004). American Cinema's Transitional Era: Audiences, Institutions, Practices. ACLS Humanities E-Book. University of California Press. ISBN 978-0-520-24027-8.
