= Little Boy Blue (1912 film) =

1912 Lubin Mother Goose film

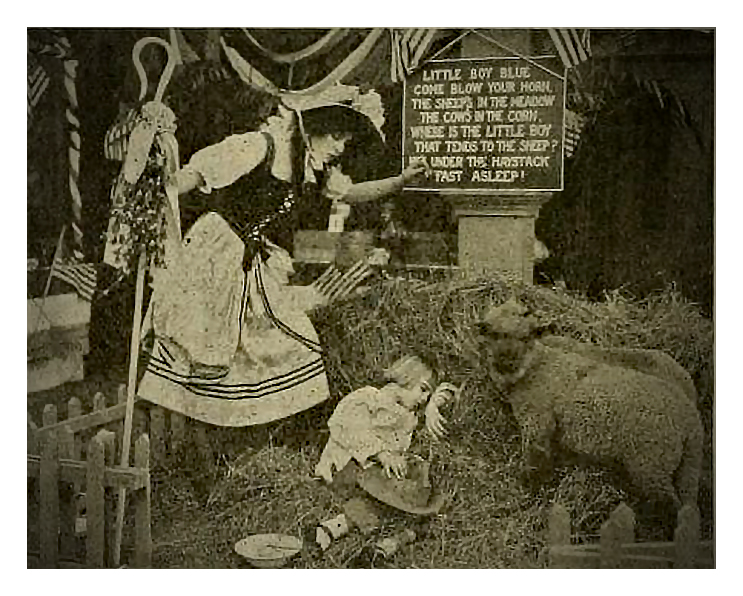
- Lubin Magazine ad for movie
- Produced by: Lubin Manufacturing Company
- Starring: Raymond Hackett; Marie Wierman
- Production company: Lubin Manufacturing Company
- Distributed by: General Film Company
- Release date: May 6, 1912 (USA)
- Running time: 1 reel; 1036'; 15 minutes
- Country: United States
- Languages: Silent; English intertitles

Little Boy Blue is a 1912 silent one-reel film produced by Lubin Manufacturing Company and distributed by the General Film Company. The movie was released on May 6, 1912. The movie featured child actor Raymond Hackett assuming the role of Harold (Little Boy Blue) and Marie Wierman playing Elizabeth, Harold's older sister.

== Plot ==
A group of small boys make up the Star baseball team. They are having a practice game in a vacant lot. The boy, Harold, is at the plate when he hits the baseball through the window of a small cottage. Harold goes to the house to apologize for the broken window. Once inside the home, he realizes the residents are a couple in their senior years, Mr. and Mrs. Stone. Harold says he is sorry for breaking their window, and the couple returns his baseball.

The landlord walks into the house while Harold is talking to the Stones. He is insisting on receiving the money for his rent. The Stones are short on funds to pay their landlord. Since they cannot cover the rent, the landlord insists they vacate by the month's end. Harold returns to the boys and tells them of the old couple's situation. The boys are struggling to determine how to help the old couple. They decide to seek advice from Harold's older sister, Elizabeth.

They find Elizabeth entertaining the Girls' Friendly Society of the Grace Church. Following their discussion, they decide that the girls' society and the boys' baseball team will give a Mother Goose Bazaar in the church vestry. They will donate the proceeds to the old couple to help them pay their rent. The participants are in Mother Goose costumes. Harold is wearing the Little Boy Blue costume. His display area has a small haystack, and Harold sells popcorn. Two Italian organ grinders arrive at the bazaar, and the children dance around them. After the organ grinders leave, Harold is exhausted. Finally, he crawls under his booth's haystack and falls asleep.

The event was a great success. The bazaar winds down, customers leave, and the youngsters count their earnings. As they prepare to go home, an anxious Elizabeth realizes Harold is missing. She turns to her boyfriend, Paul, seeking his advice. Paul suggests that the organ grinders abducted him. They rush outside and then tell a police officer about the missing boy and the musicians. A quick search finds the organ grinders performing at a different street intersection. After a short talk, the street musicians convince the police officer they do not know where Harold is.

They return to the Stone's cottage. They ask Mrs. Stone, a seasoned mother, for her guidance. Mrs. Stone feels Harold is still in the church and offers to assist them in their search. They return to the church vestry, seeking Harold. Mrs. Stone discovers Little Boy Blue "under the haystack, fast asleep".

== Cast ==
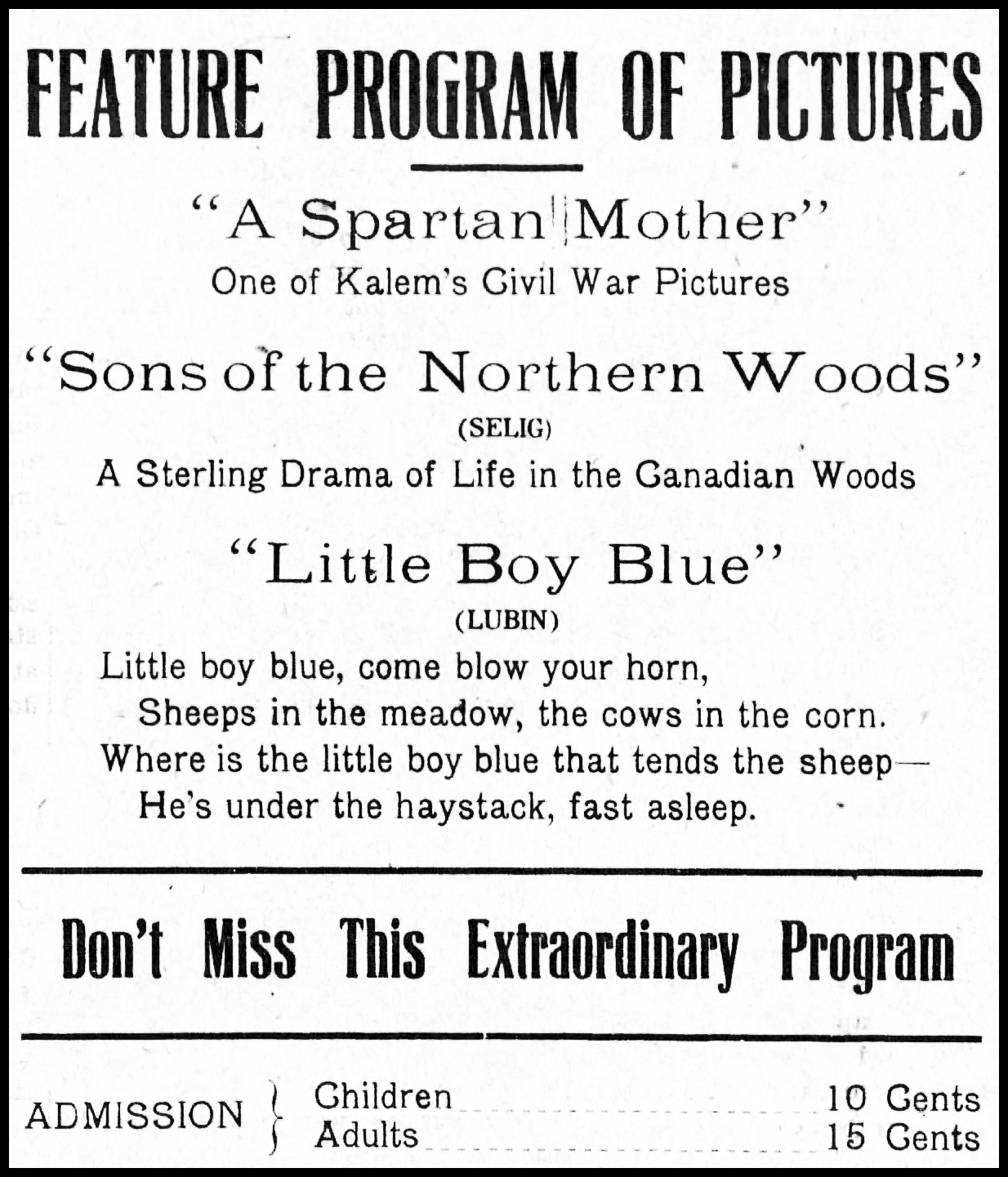
Actor	Role
Raymond Hackett	Harold (Little Boy Blue)
Mrs. George W. Walters	Mrs. Stone
James Humphrey	Mr. Stone
Marie Wierman	Elizabeth (Harold's Sister)
Martin J. Faust	Paul (Elizabeth's Sweetheart)
Richard Morris	The Organ Grinder
Roswell "Buster" Johnson	Child (uncredited)

== Production ==
=== Casting ===
- Martin (Marty) Faust (1886–1943) was born on January 16, 1886 in Poughkeepsie, New York. He was an American film actor and director. He was active in the film industry between 1910 and 1944. Faust was 26 years-old when he played Paul (Elizabeth's Sweetheart).
- Raymond Hackett (1902–1958) was an American stage and screen actor from a theatrical family in New York. Hackett was born on July 15, 1902, in New York City, the son of Maurice Hackett and silent screen actress Florence Hackett. He became a child actor, making his debut on Broadway in 1907. The family moved to Philadelphia. After the move, Ray left the stage and started performing as a childhood actor in Lubin movies. In those days, he was called Master Raymond Hackett and often appeared with his younger brother, Albert Hackett was nine years old when he played Harold (Little Boy Blue.) Later in life, he reminisced about an event that caused a delay in filming this movie. (Note: The family lived a short distance from the studio. When Raymond and his brother were not engaged, they returned home for schooling. The route to and from the studio passed through a tough neighborhood. On one occasion, he had a call for four o'clock at the studio. He was wearing a Buster Brown haircut and was playing the part of "Little Boy Blue." On the way to work, he got into an altercation with eight or nine kids his age. Later, Hackett appeared on the set with a swollen black eye and a bleeding split lip. Production was halted for several days while he healed.) He remained active in film until 1931, when his career faded.
- Buster Johnson (1908–1969) was born Roswell J. Johnson on July 12, 1908 in Brooklyn, New York. He was another American child actor cast in this children's film. Buster was 3 years-old when he acted in the uncredited role of a background child.
- Richard Morris (1862–1924) was born William Richard Stuart Morris on January 30, 1862 in Charlestown, Massachusetts. He was an American Opera singer, stage actor, and silent movie character player. This was his first appearance in a credited movie role. He appeared in 59 films between 1912 and 1924. Morris was 50 years-old when he played one of the Italian organ grinders.
- Mrs. George W. Walters (1835–1916) was an English actress born Mary Stanton in c. 1835. She was a contract player for Lubin and considered " ...the grande dame of the Lubin company." Walters was 77 years-old when she played Mrs. Stone.
- Marie Wierman (1893–1956) was born Marie Elizabeth Wierman on November 6, 1893 in Philadelphia, Pennsylvania. Wierman started her career at Lubin at the urging of Lubin director Barry O'Neil, a friend of the family. She married Napoleon B. Kukuck (Stage name of Lee Phelps) on December 21, 1916. After her marriage, she acquired the stage name of Mary Warren. Wierman was 18 years-old when she played Elizabeth, Harold's older sister. This film was one of her earliest efforts. She was an American actress active in the movie industry between 1912 – 1934.

=== Story ===
This film is based on the English nursery rhyme Little Boy Blue.

=== Director ===
The director of this production is unknown. In 1912, the Lubin Company had eight production units, each with a assigned producer-director.
These are possible candidates for the director of this picture:

- Joseph W. Smiley (1870 - 1945) was born in Boston, Massachusetts on June 18, 1870. Quoting from book, "The King of the Movies" the author states: "Lubin's Kiddie films were directed by Joseph Smiley, one of several new directors hired in 1911." Another article in The Moving Picture News dated July 13, 1912 stated: "One of the Lubin Troupes, directed by Joseph Smiley. Most of the company are children under 9 years of age. The small figure second from the left is the famous Roswell "Buster" Johnson, only 3 1/2 years old and playing star roles."
- Arthur V. Johnson (1876-1916) was born in Cincinnati, Ohio on February 2, 1876. Quoting from book, "The King of the Movies" the author states: "The Hackett boys (Ray and Albert) appeared in a number of films, many of which were written specifically for them. Beginning in 1912 their stepfather, Arthur Johnson, often directed them and occasionally appeared with them as well.
- Barry O'Neil (1865-1918) was born Thomas J. McCarthy on September 24, 1865 in New York City. He came to Lubin in 1912 and immediately became an important director known for his realism in films. (Note: "Film historian Linda Kowall wrote to the author in 1988: "Barry O'Neil, one of Lubin's main directors, was reported by all who remembered him as quite a pompous, know-it-all fellow who fancied himself a DeMille before there was a DeMille - complete with puttees, megaphone, and the whole bit. For the making of the 1914 Lubin feature The Wolf, he put cast and crew through a nightmarish experience at Saranac Lake in midwinter in the name of 'realism.' O'Neil was fond of putting his company at risk to achieve striking results.") An article in The Moving Picture News dated July 13, 1912 stated: "Number 1 Lubin Stock Company under the management of General Director Barry O'Neil including ... Mrs. Geo W. Walters, Richard Morris, Martin J. Faust, Miss Marie Wierman." All four of these actors appeared in the film.

=== Scenario ===
Around this time in the history of film, a dual writing process was used in silent films. The scenario writer develops the storyline. (Note: "The history of the screenplay begins [. . .] in the 1910s, around the time Thomas Harper Ince began making films. [. . .] Under Ince's guidance, 'writing for film became truly efficient for the first time . . . and developed into the indispensable core of the filmmaking system.' The written text that guided a film's production became a literary form. The text rendered the shots that the director later realized.") The title writer creates Intertitles (title cards), which show spoken words that appear on-screen; explain actions relevant to the story; indicate the time and place settings of the story; and provide context.

The scenario writer for this film is unknown. According to an article in the July 1913 issue of The Billboard, Lubin had a dedicated scenario department. A scenarist from this pool of writers was probably selected to create the script. (Note: Lubin Scenario Department: Scenario Editor: Lawrence S. McCloskey; Writers: Edwin Barbour; Shannon Fife; Clay Green; George Terwilliger; Emmett Campbell Hall)

=== Studio ===
The Lubin Manufacturing Company was an American motion picture production company founded by Siegmund Lubin. In 1896, Lubin started distributing films for Thomas Edison, and in 1897, he started the production of films for commercial release. The Lubin Manufacturing Company was created in 1902 and incorporated in 1909 in Philadelphia, Pennsylvania. In 1910, Siegmund Lubin constructed a state-of-the-art studio on the corner of Indiana Avenue and Twentieth Street in Philadelphia. This studio was recognized as Lubinville. It stood as one of the world's innovative studios, featuring stages with manufactured lighting, editing rooms, laboratories, and workshops. After producing over a thousand motion pictures, the Lubin Film Company was forced into bankruptcy. On September 1, 1916, the Lubin Manufacturing Company closed its doors for good.

== Release and reception ==
=== Official release ===
The official film release date to U.S. theaters was May 6, 1912. The film was released in the United Kingdom on July 4, 1912.

=== Copyright ===
The Preface of the publication — Copyright Office * The Library of Congress Catalog of Copyright Entries, printed in 1951 reads:

Motion Pictures, 1912-1939, is a cumulative catalog listing works registered in the Copyright Office in Classes L and M between August 24, 1912, and December 31, 1939. Prior to that period motion pictures were registered in the category of photographs. These earlier works have not been included in this catalog because of the difficulty of identifying the motion pictures so registered.

Since this move was released in May 1912, there is no entry in this publication for a copyright. A further explanation is offered here. (Note: Quoted from LOC article by Wendi Maloney "A hundred years ago, a new category of work became subject to copyright protection: motion pictures. The Townsend Amendment to the U.S. copyright law took effect Aug. 24, 1912, creating one class for dramatic motion pictures and one class for newsreels and similar material. The first year the Copyright Office accepted motion-picture applications, it registered 892 movies. One of the earliest was "The Charge of the Light Brigade" registered by famed inventor Thomas Edison on Sept. 26, 1912. Before inclusion of motion pictures in the copyright law, copyright owners typically registered their movies as a collection of still photographs, which the law had covered since 1865. More than 3,000 paper copies of films in that format were deposited with the Copyright Office. Many of these early films—transferred to film stock in the 1950s—are now accessible in the Library's collections.")

=== Reviews ===
The critiques featured in assorted trade publications proved invaluable when deciding to watch or book a newly released movie. However, a fan or theater owner's decision can be challenging even after reading multiple movie reviews, especially when critics have contrasting reviews. In the end, it depends on personal perspectives and the importance assigned to the movie review and the reviewer.

- A review of Lubin's "LITTLE BOY BLUE" reviewed the May 6, 1912 issue of the" Moving Picture World:

"A very pleasing picture, full of children. The Little Boy Blue is played by a youngster who has appeared before in Lubin pictures, and who made a hit recently, when as the son of a sick man, he induced a president of an insurance company to come to his father's relief. In this picture he will also make friends. Mr. Geo. B. Walkers is again very lovable in a grandmother's part. Boy Blue's big sister and brother also do good work."

- A brief review of the film was published on May 23, 1912 edition of The Wilmington Dispatch:

"Little Boy Blue" Lubin's greatest, freshest and brightest film of childhood theme, will be presented at the Grand today, heading a star bill, which will include the Vitagraph's masterpiece, "The Greatest Thing in the World." Every child should see "Little Boy Blue" though it will also furnish a beautiful feast for the older folks".

== Other boy blues ==
1912 proved to be a competitive year for projects named "Little Boy Blue."

- The Pat Powers (1869-1948) production of "Little Boy Blue" was released on January 16, 1912. The film was based on the famous "Little Boy Blue" poem penned by Eugene Field in 1888. (Note: The little toy dog is covered with dust, But sturdy and staunch he stands; And the little toy soldier is red with rust, And his musket molds in his hands. Time was when the little toy dog was new, And the soldier was passing fair; And that was the time when our Little Boy Blue Kissed them and put them there. — From the poem by Eugene Field)
- Henry Savage (1859 – 1927) was an American Musical impresario and Boston real estate mogul. The light opera "Little Boy Blue" was among his many successful productions. The operetta was presented in two acts and set in Paris and Scotland. The musical had a run of 184 performances from November 27, 1911 through April 1913.

== Preservation status ==
Many silent-era films did not survive for reasons as explained on this Wikipedia page. (Note: Film is history. With every foot of film lost, we lose a link to our culture, the world around us, each other, and ourselves. – Martin Scorsese, filmmaker, director NFPF Board A report by Library of Congress film historian and archivist David Pierce estimates that: around 75% of original silent-era films have perished; 14% of the 10,919 silent films released by major studios exist in their original 35 mm or other formats; 11% survive only in full-length foreign versions or film formats of lesser image quality.) Since no records detail this film's status, it is presumed all copies of this film are lost.

== Gallery ==
The cast of actors and actresses in this movie

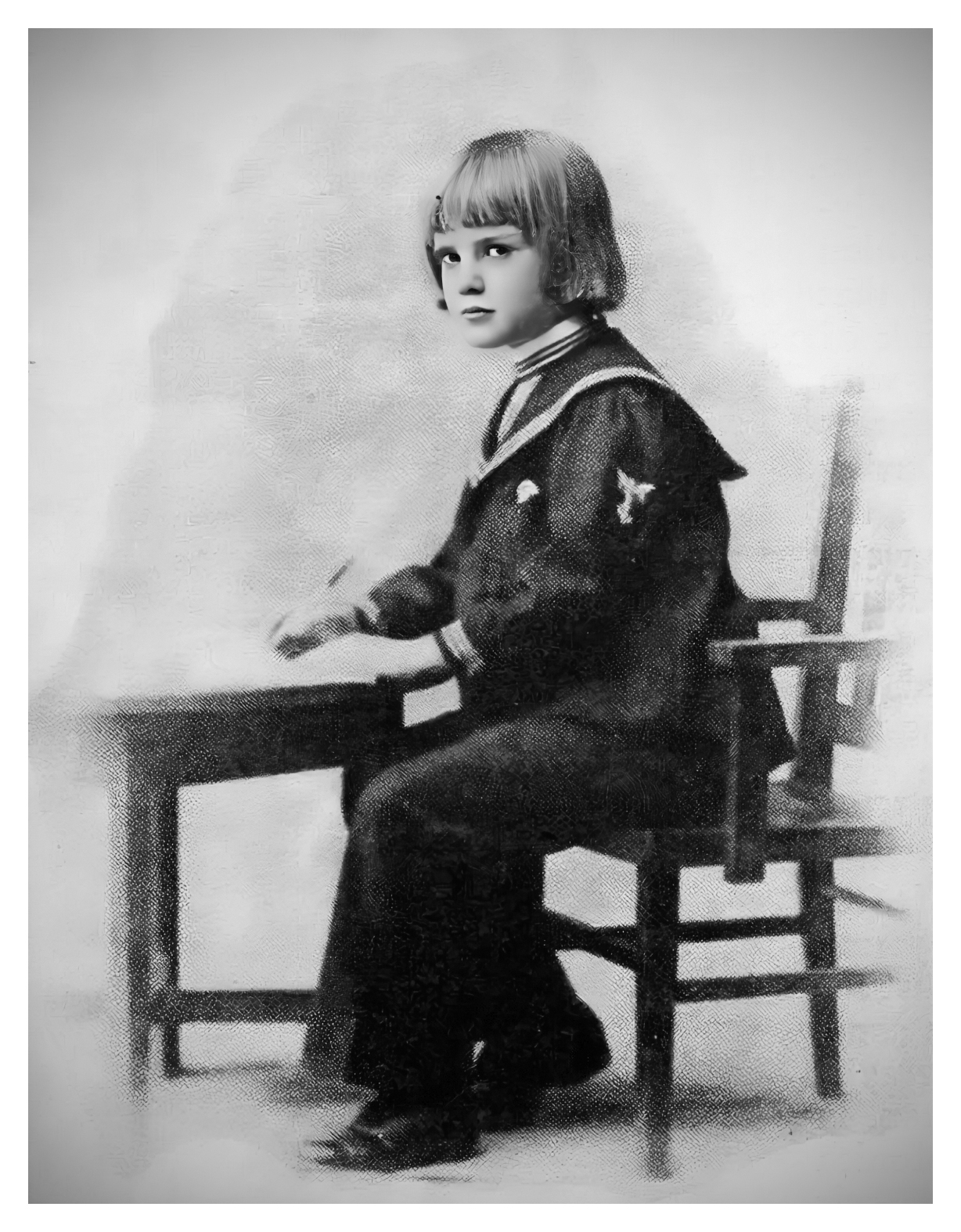
Raymond Hackett
Harold
1911

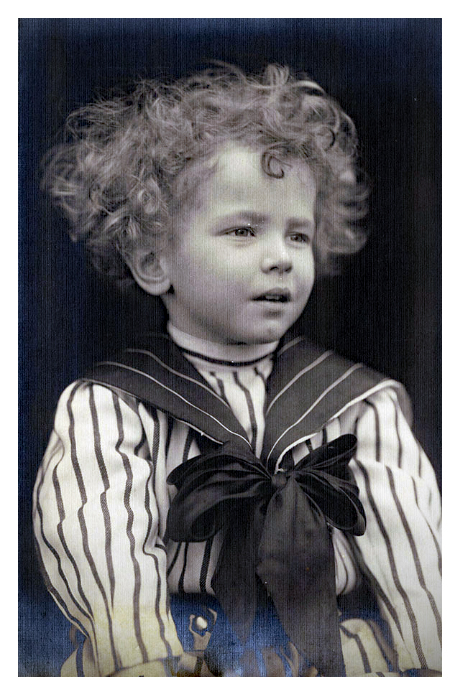
Buster Johnson
date unk

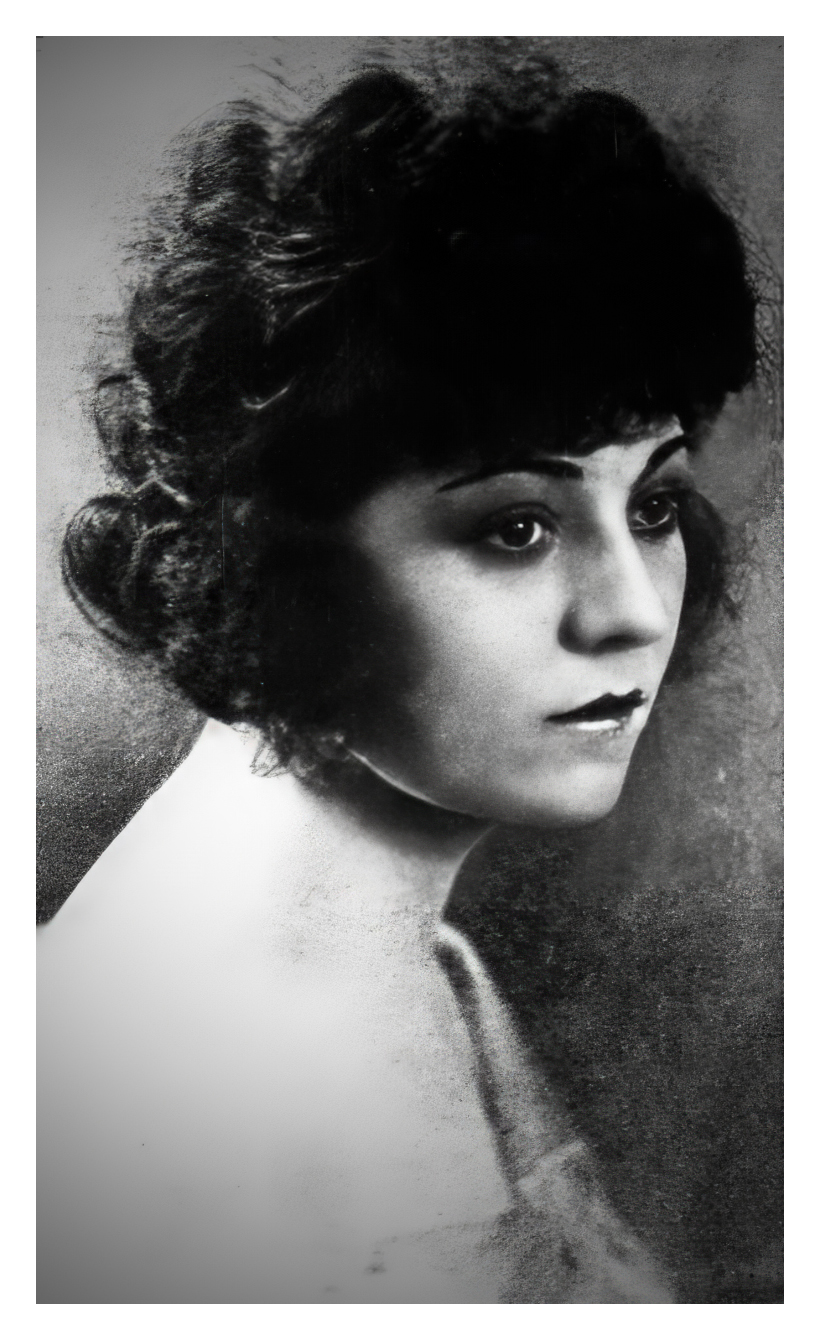
Marie Wierman
Elizabeth
1918

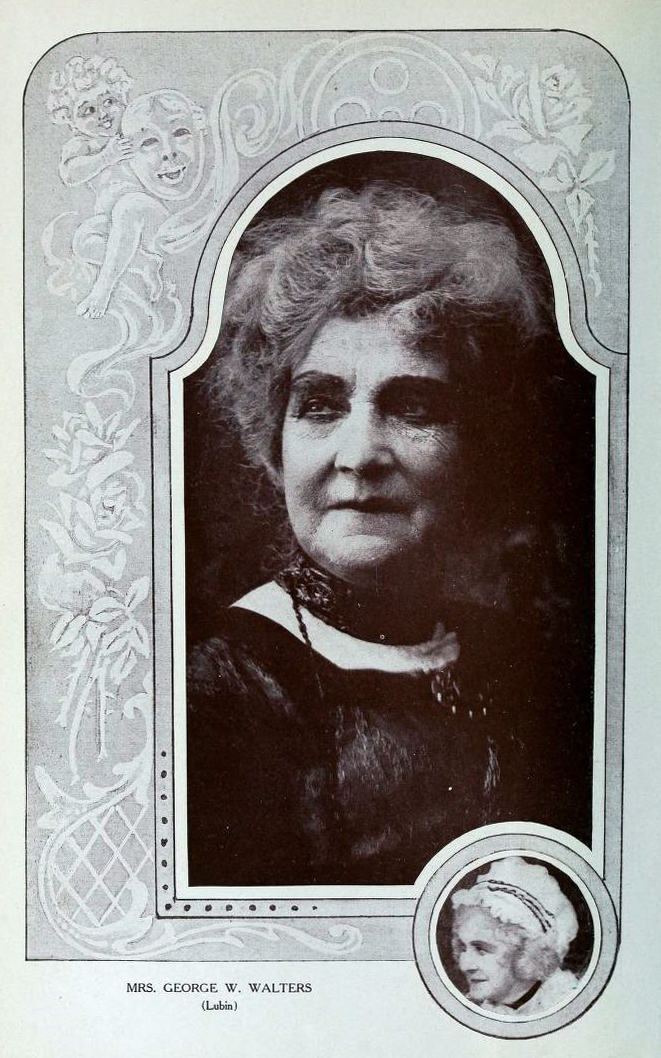
Mrs G Walters
Mrs. Stone
1912

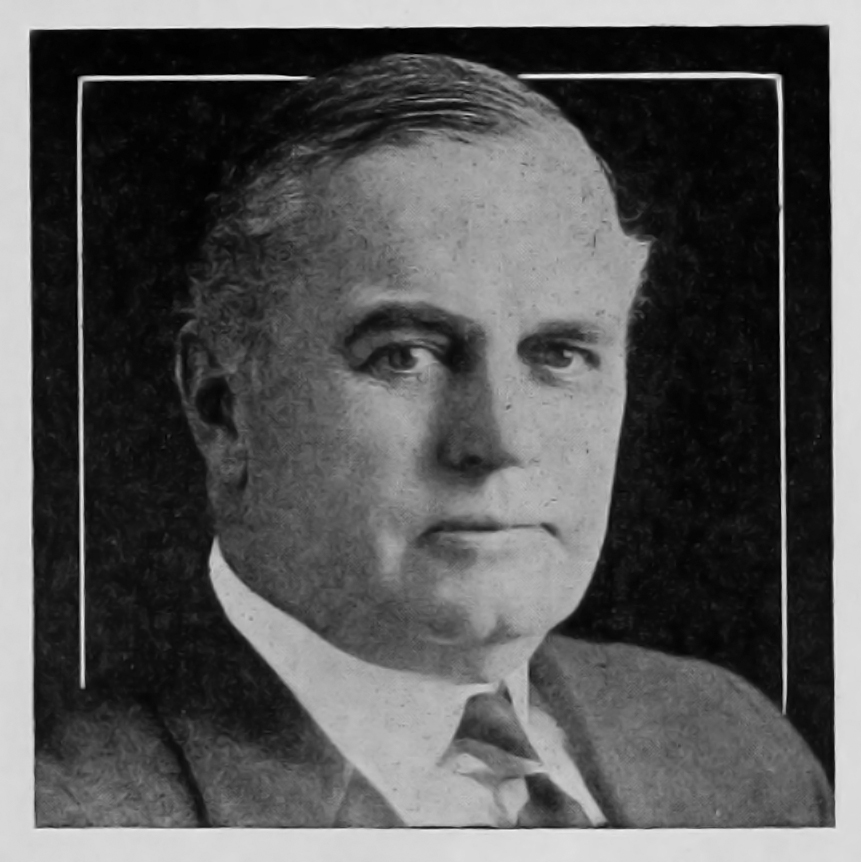
Richard Morris
Organ Grinder
1916
Movie Stills

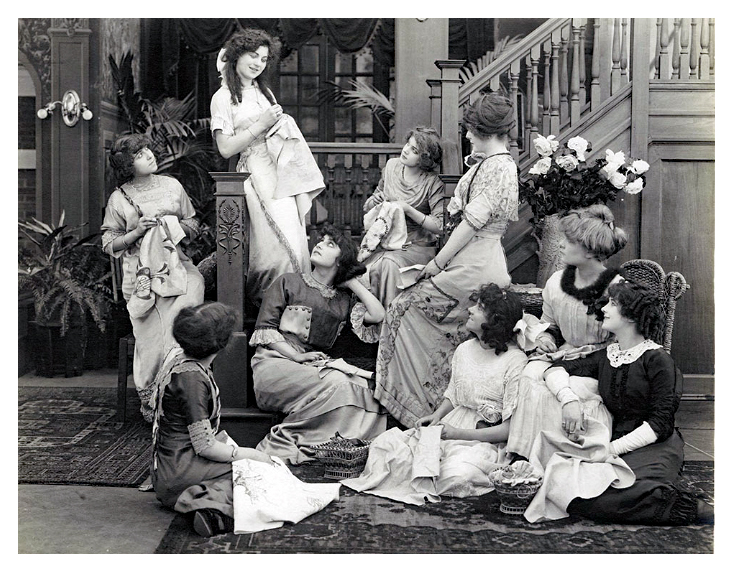
Film Still

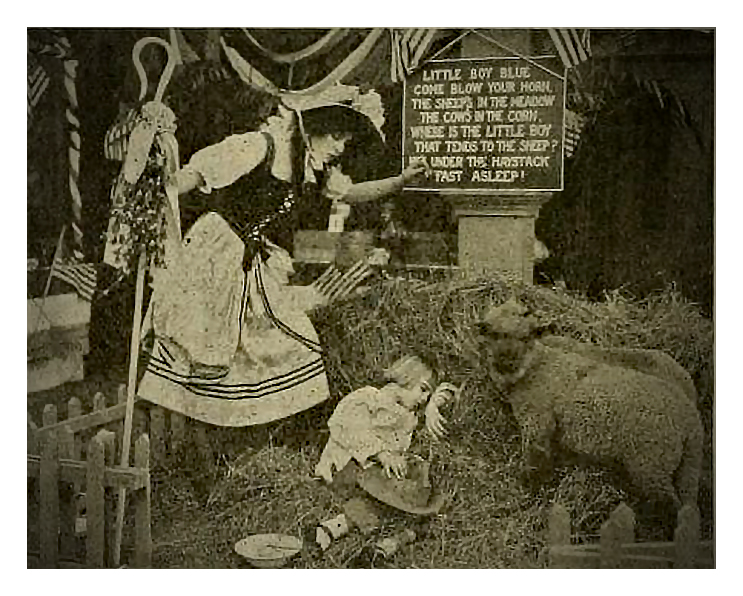
Little Boy Blue
1912

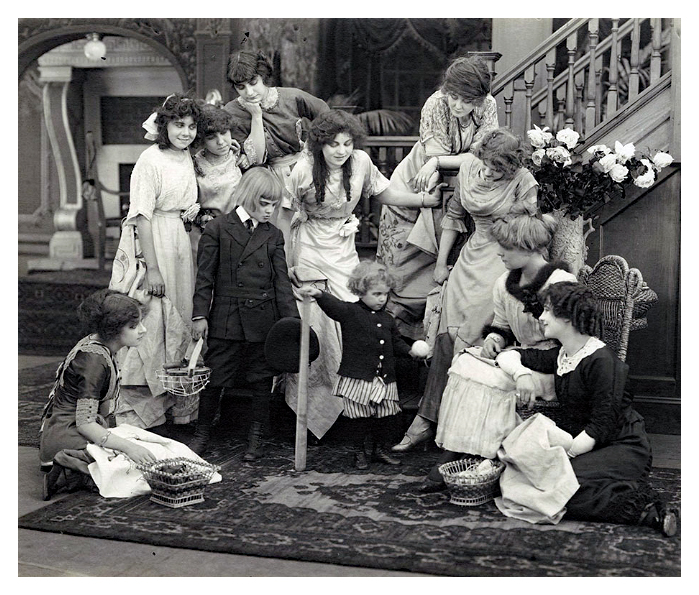
Film Still

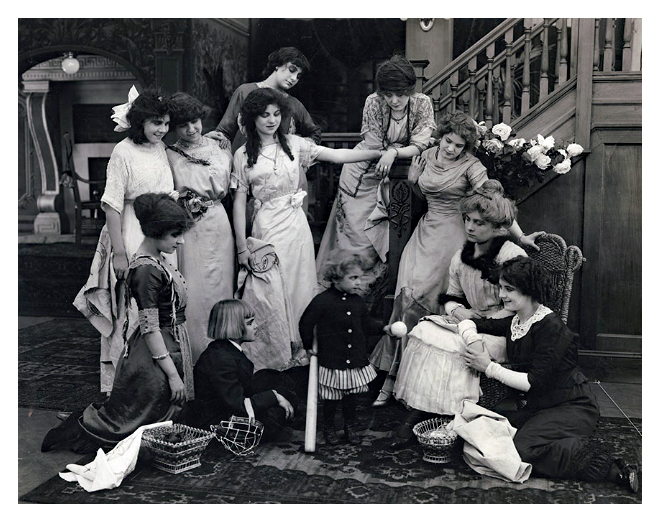
Film Still

== Bibliography ==
- Motion Picture News. Motion Picture News Incorporated. 1912.
- Eckhardt, J.P. (1997). The King of the Movies: Film Pioneer Siegmund Lubin. Fairleigh Dickinson University Press. ISBN 978-0-8386-3728-9.
- Vazzana, Eugene Michael (October 12, 2001). Silent Film Necrology. McFarland. ISBN 9780786410590 – via Google Books.
- Boon, K.A. (2008). Script Culture and the American Screenplay. Contemporary Approaches to Film and Media Series. Wayne State University Press. ISBN 978-0-8143-3571-0.
