= The Amazing Woman =

1920 film

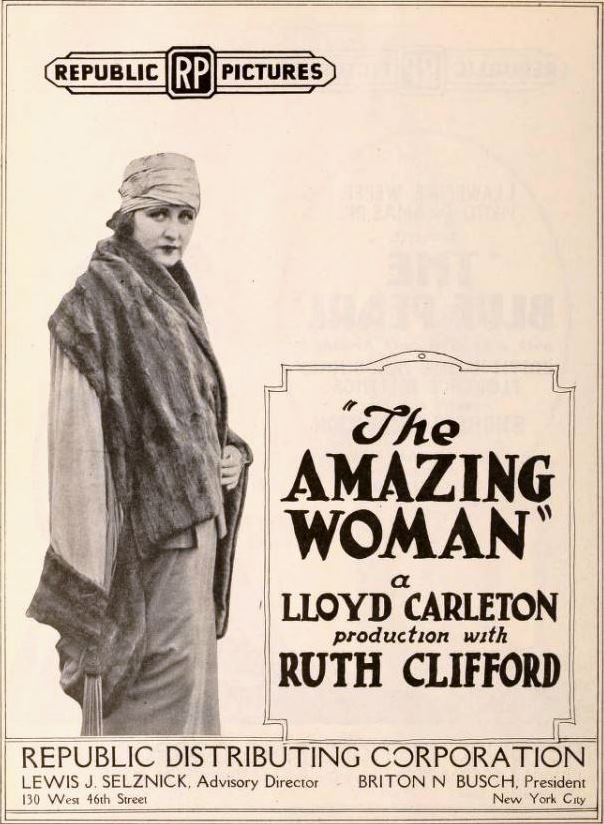
- Advertisement for film
- Directed by: Lloyd B. Carleton
- Starring: Ruth Clifford; Edward Coxen
- Cinematography: Fred G. Hartman
- Production company: Lloyd Carleton Productions
- Distributed by: Republic Distributors
- Release date: January 1920
- Running time: 5 reels
- Country: United States
- Language: Silent (English intertitles)

The Amazing Woman is a 1920 American silent drama film directed by Lloyd B. Carleton and starring Ed Coxen and Ruth Clifford. It was released by the Republic Distributing Company. The film is extant and preserved by the Library of Congress.

== Plot ==
As described in a film magazine, Anitra, who has come to believe that Ralph, the soldier she loves, will never return from abroad, yields to the plea of John, a man many years her senior, and goes to live with him in the city. In time he tires of her and dismisses her with a cash settlement. She resolves to protect the city’s poor children from being exploited by forcing the wealthy to pay for them. Like the Flame, she captivates a wealthy man-about-town. She uses the money to establish a hospital for the poor and a gambling house for the rich, using the proceeds from the latter to support the former. The return of her sweetheart from overseas influences her to a new course. After setting up an endowment to pay for the hospital, she works and manages to get her sweetheart elected mayor on a reform ticket, after which she closes her gambling house along with other evil institutions in the city. Then she discovers that Ralph's father is John, the same man who caused her downfall, and her happiness seems wrecked. However, it turns out that he is only Ralph's foster-father, and after his death, she ultimately finds happiness marrying Ralph.

== Cast ==
- Edward Coxen as Ralph Strong
- Ruth Clifford as Anitra Frane
- Andrew Robson as John Strong
- Richard Morris as Gaston Duval
- Mrs. Orlamonde as Anitra's mother
