= The Devil's Bondwoman =

1916 film by Lloyd B. Carleton

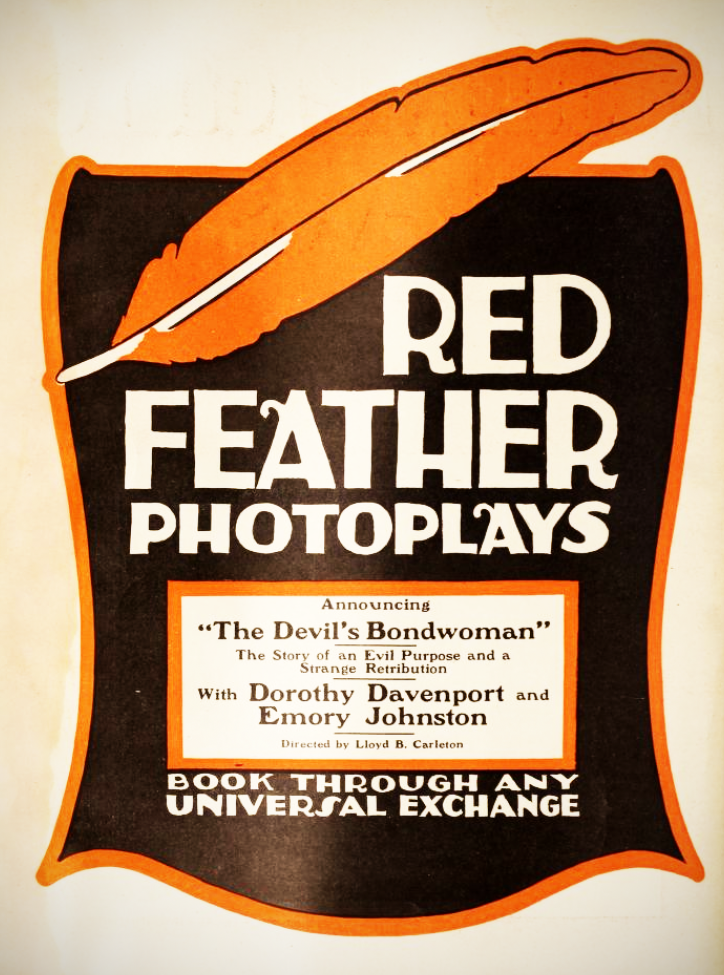
- Motion Picture Weekly Ad
- Directed by: Lloyd B. Carleton
- Written by: Fred Myton
- Screenplay by: Maie B. Havey
- Story by: F. McGrew Willis
- Produced by: Universal Red Feather
- Starring: Dorothy Davenport; Emory Johnson
- Distributed by: Universal
- Release date: November 20, 1916
- Running time: 50–75 minutes (5 reels)
- Country: USA
- Language: English intertitles

The Devil's Bondwoman is a 1916 American silent Melodrama directed by Lloyd B. Carleton. The film was based on the story by F. McGrew Willis and scenarized by Maie B. Havey and Fred Myton. The movie features Dorothy Davenport and Emory Johnson and employed the same cast seen in other Red Feather films, e.g., Barriers of Society, Black Friday.

The film has an allegorical prologue taking place in Hell and an epilogue. Wealthy banker Mason Van Horton becomes involved with socialite Doria Manners, who is married to businessman John Manners. When Mason falls in Love with another woman named Beverly Hope, he tries to end the affair with Doria. A revengeful Doria tells her husband Mason tried to seduce her and wants John to ruin Van Horton financially. An incensed John Manners arranges for one of Mason's central banks to go bankrupt but discovers his wife making Love to Prince Vandloup. John instantly realizes Doria lied about Mason while having an affair with the prince. John Manners leaves her, and Prince Vandloup changes into the Devil and carts Doria away.

The movie was released by Universal on November 20, 1916.

== Plot ==
The film's prologue transports the moviegoers to the grottoes of Hell. Life's Creator has gathered the underworld spirits to help him create a mortal. They work non-stop and complete their creation. While the spirits admire their work, the Devil enters. Examining the Creator's mortal, Satan determines one attribute is missing. He instills the mortal with the Love of Self. The Devil knows pride is the most sinister of the Seven Deadly sins, and all other immoralities spring forth from the sin of pride.

Satan has added his last touches to the mortal and feels the "Man" is ready to navigate the road of life. The Devil chooses the easiest path for the man and sends him forth into the world. Satan returns to Hell, discovering the spirits have created another mortal. Satan declares this mortal a "Woman." The Devil adds no other attributes to the woman and sends her to follow life's pathways. Satan knows the man will take care of her downward spiral. Maniacal laughter fills the cavern–Satan knows he has done well.

Mason Van Horton is the young president of Van Horton bank, a self-made millionaire, and a ranking member of society. The bank is in an impoverished section of town. Hundreds of workers have placed their hard-earned life savings in the bank. Mason has taken a carefree approach toward the bank, and it is on the precipice of failure. The elder John Manners is wealthy and married to his wife, Doria. She is a social vampire who seeks to raise her social standing. John Manners has assisted Mason in his ascent to the top of his business. However, he is not above taking advantage of Mason's missteps whenever they present themselves.

Doria tires of her husband's company and focuses her flirtatious talents on Mason Van Horton. She flirts and entices Mason, and he does not resist her overtures. Beverly Hope visits her aunt, Barbara. Mason meets Beverly at a social function and falls in Love. Beverly is so sweet and virtuous that Mason reflects upon his past life. Could he have done anything differently so he could ask her to marry him?

There is a gala at the Manners' home. They have invited all the social elites. During the party, Doria snuggles up to Mason and asks him to meet her privately. Mason agrees, and after all the guests have gone, he sneaks upstairs to Doria's apartment. She is sitting on a divan, waiting for his arrival. Mason enters the room, sits on the sofa, and they embrace. He pulls back after a brief sigh and then leans forward to kiss Doria. Mason takes one last glance at Doria as their lips are about to meet. The room seems to darken around them, and he can only see the face of his beloved Beverly. He reels back in fear and stumbles to his feet. Mason rushes from the room while every fiber of his body is writhing in guilt. After all, he almost betrayed the woman he loved, but the thought of Beverly broke Doria's spell. As he leaves the room, he passes a curious John Manners.

Doria is beside herself when she cannot win the affection of Mason Van Horton. Mason's rejection of Doria triggers a vengeance response. She tells her husband; Mason had forced his way into her room and tried to have his way. An enraged Manners wants to kill Van Horton. Doria pleads with her husband not to harm him but to ruin him financially. With Manner's business acumen, it doesn't take long for him to bankrupt Van Horton's bank. The bank's investors lose every penny of their savings. Mason holds himself responsible for the failure of his bank. He commits to making total restitution. He sacrifices his entire fortune to repay the poor people that invested in his bank. While all the other intrigues occur, Beverly falls in Love with Mason. Beverly has agreed to marry Mason and help him work his way through his plans for restitution.

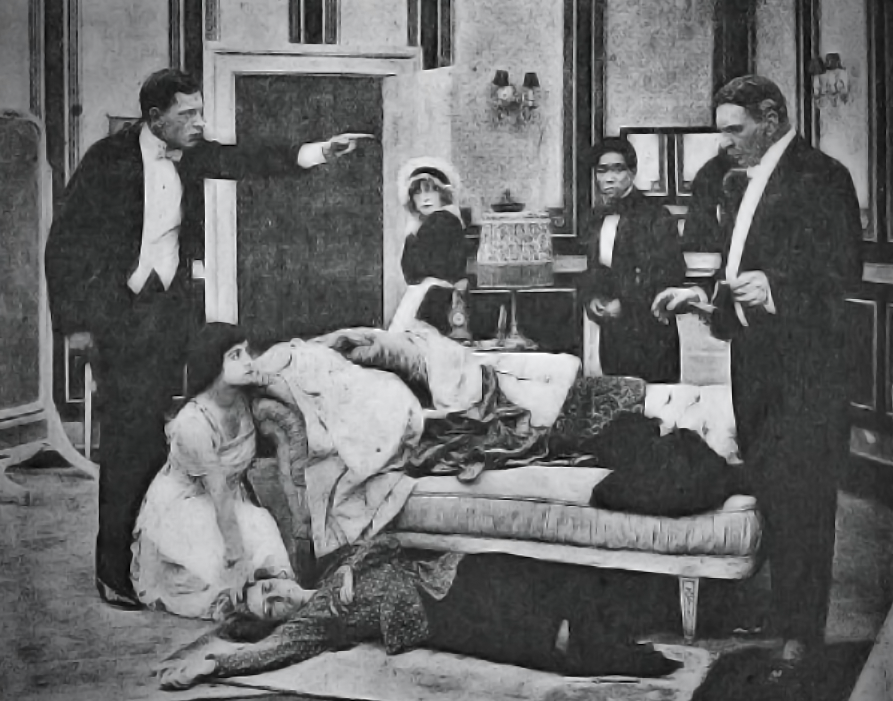
A woman who lost her savings stabs herself in Doria's room

Doria throws a reception at her house and invites Mason. He accepts, hoping he can find some private time with John Manners. The reception is in full swing when a strange woman shows up. She was a former Van Horton failed bank member and had lost her life savings. Doria discovers her background and orders her from the house. Instead of leaving, the woman slips upstairs to Doria's room. Once in the room, she stabs herself and falls, bleeding to the floor. At the reception, the dinner guests gather around a table. Doria is entertaining the guests when a drop of blood falls from the ceiling. The shaken dinner guests are astonished. During the confusion in the other room, Mason and John Manners are in the library discussing business when a guest hurries in and tells them about the drops of blood. John Manners rushes upstairs to see what happened. After assessing the situation, he returns to the library. Passing one of the upstairs rooms, he hears Doria and Prince Vandloup making Love. He enters the room, confronts the two, and condemns Doria. John Manners now recognizes how Doria had manipulated him. Manners heads downstairs and explains to his bewildered guests that Doria was behind the collapse of the Van Horton bank. Under the circumstances, Manners will help Mason make restitution. He expels Doria from the house and banishes her forever.

Mason and Beverly profess their Love for each other and get married. Doria has always had an infatuation with Prince Vandloup. The prince had sex with her at every opportunity. Because Doria failed to seduce Mason, she must now pay the Devil his due. Prince Vandloup transforms into the Devil, and Doria learns she is in the power of evil and forever the Devil's Bondwoman.

== Cast ==
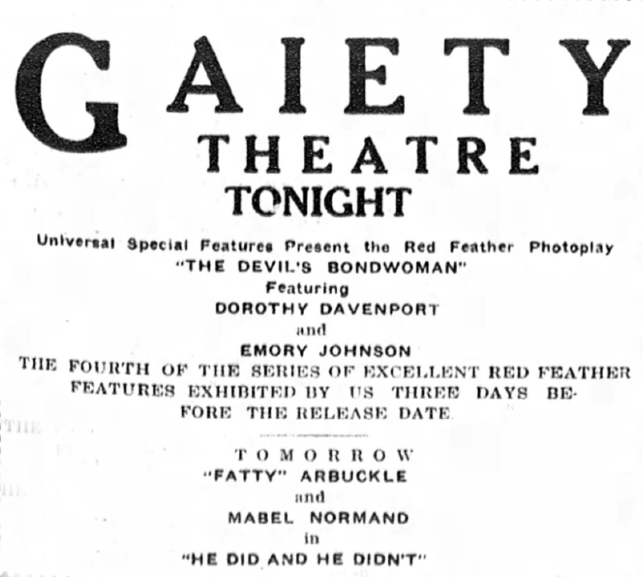
Actor	Role
Dorothy Davenport	Beverly Hope
Emory Johnson	Mason Van Horton
Adele Farrington	Doria Manners
William Canfield	John Manners
Arthur Hoyt	The Alchemist
Richard Morris	Prince Vandloup
C. Norman Hammond	The Spirit of Fire
Miriam Shelby	Aunt Barbara

== Production ==
=== Pre-production ===
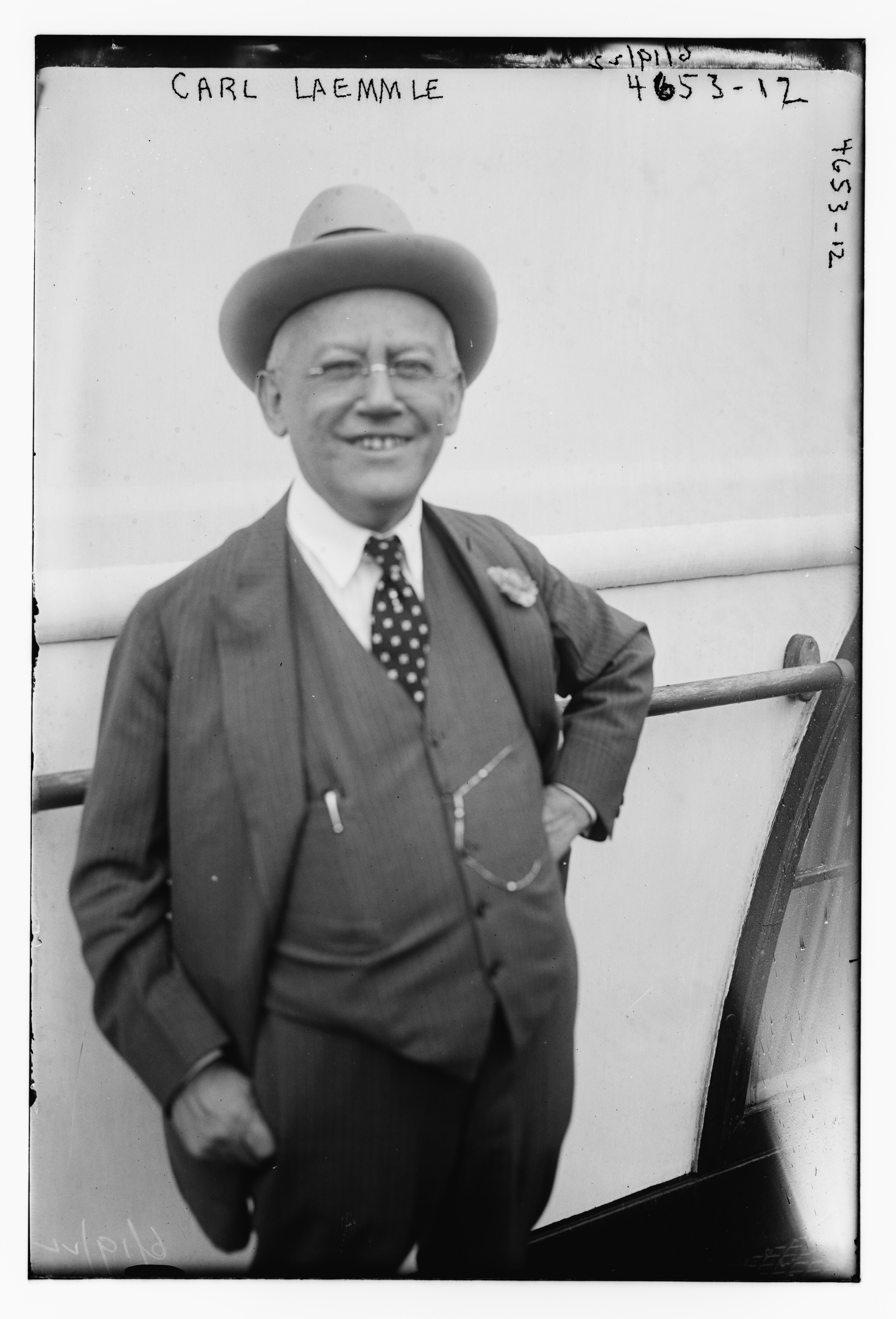
Carl Laemmle in 1918

Universal Logo 1915

In the book, "American Cinema's Transitional Era," the authors point out, The years between 1908 and 1917 witnessed what may have been the most significant transformation in American film history. During this "transitional era", widespread changes affected film form and film genres, filmmaking practices and industry structure, exhibition sites, and audience demographics. One aspect of this transition was the longer duration of films. Feature films (Note: A "feature film" or "feature-length film" is a narrative film (motion picture or "movie") with a running time long enough to be considered the principal or sole presentation in a commercial entertainment program. A film can be distributed as a feature film if it equals or exceeds a specified minimum running time and satisfies other defined criteria. The minimum time depends on the governing agency. The American Film Institute and the British Film Institute require films to have a minimum running time of forty minutes or longer. Other film agencies, e.g.,Screen Actors Guild, require a film's running time to be 60 minutes or greater. Currently, most feature films are between 70 and 210 minutes long.) were slowly becoming the standard fare for Hollywood producers. Before 1913, you could count the yearly features on two hands. Between 1915 and 1916, the number of feature movies rose 2 1/2 times or from 342 films to 835. There was a recurring claim that Carl Laemmle was the longest-running studio chief resisting the production of feature films. Universal was not ready to downsize its short film business because short films were cheaper, faster, and more profitable to produce than feature films. (Note: " Short Film" - There are no defined parameters for a Short film except for one immutable rule -the film's maximum running time. The Academy of Motion Picture Arts and Sciences defines a short film as "an original motion picture that has a running time of 40 minutes or less, including all credits".)

Laemmle would continue to buck this trend while slowly increasing his output of features. In 1914, Laemmle published an essay titled - Doom of long Features Predicted. In 1916, Laemmle ran an advertisement extolling Bluebird films while adding the following vocabulary on the top of the ad. (Note: The moving picture business is here to stay. That you must admit, despite carping critics and blundering sore-heads, true, some exhibitors have found business so good lately — but if you get down to facts when you look for a reason why, it's a 100 to 1 shot that they are, and for some time have been, dallying with a feature program. Some of these wise ones will tell you that business has picked up since they went into features, — BUT — ask them whether they are talking NET or GROSS. They will find they have an immediate appointment and terminate your queries unceremoniously. Funny how we like to kid ourselves, isn't it? The man who is packing 'em in and losing money on features is envied by his competitor, who is laying by a bit every day, and has a good steady, dependable patronage but admits to a few vacant seats at some performances. When this chap wakes up, he will realize that he has a gold mine and that good advertising will make it produce to capacity. The moral is that if you can tie up to the Universal Program, DO IT. If you can't NOW, watch your first chance. Let the people know what you have, and let the feature man go on to ruin if he wants to. You should worry! Motion Picture News - May 6, 1916) Universal made 91 feature films in 1916, including 44 Bluebirds and 47 Red Feather productions.

This film was labeled with Universal's Red Feather brand, indicating it was a low-budget feature film. This film was the 43rd Red Feather feature film produced by Universal in 1916.

==== Casting ====
- Dorothy Davenport (1895–1977) was an established star for Universal when the 21 year-old actress played Beverly Hope. She had acted in hundreds of movies by the time she starred in this film. Most of these films were 2-reel shorts, as was the norm in Hollywood's teen years. She had been making movies since 1910. She started dating Wally Reid when she was barely 16, and he was 20. They married in 1913. After her husband died in 1923, she used the name "Mrs. Wallace Reid" in the credits for any project she took part in. Besides being an actress, she would eventually become a film director, producer, and writer.
- Emory Johnson (1894–1960) was 22 years old when he acted in this movie as Mason Van Horton. In January 1916, Emory signed a contract with Universal Film Manufacturing Company. Carl Laemmle of Universal Film Manufacturing Company thought he saw great potential in Johnson, so he chose him to be Universal's new leading man. Laemmle hoped Johnson would become another Wallace Reed. A significant part of his plan was to create a movie couple that would sizzle on the silver screen. Laemmle thought Dorothy Davenport and Emory Johnson could make the chemistry he sought. Johnson and Davenport would complete 13 films together. They started with the successful feature production of Doctor Neighbor in May 1916 and ended with The Devil's Bondwoman in November 1916. After completing the last movie, Laemmle thought Johnson did not have the screen presence he wanted. He decided not to renew his contract. Johnson would make 17 movies in 1916, including six shorts and 11 feature-length Dramas. 1916 would become the second-highest movie output of his entire acting career. Emory acted in 25 films for Universal, mostly dramas with a sprinkling of comedies and westerns.
- Richard Morris (1862–1924) was a 54 year-old actor when he played Prince Vandloup. He was a character actor and former opera singer known for Granny (1913). He would eventually participate in many Johnson projects, including |In the Name of the Law (1922), The Third Alarm (1922), The West~Bound Limited (1923), The Mailman (1923), The Spirit of the USA (1924) until his untimely death in 1924.
- Adele Farrington (Mrs. Hobart Bosworth) (c. 1867-1936) was 49 years old when she portrayed Doria Manners. She was also a Universal contract player appearing in 74 films between 1914 and 1926. Although she got her start in movies when she was 47 years old (1914), Universal cast her mostly in character leads. She frequently acted alongside her husband, Hobart Bosworth, whom she married in 1909 and divorced in 1920. Besides being an actress, she was also a music composer and writer.
- Arthur Hoyt (1874–1953) was 42 years old when he portrayed the Alchemist. He was an American film character actor who appeared in more than 275 films. He began his serious acting career in 1916 and remained active in the industry until 1947.

==== Director ====
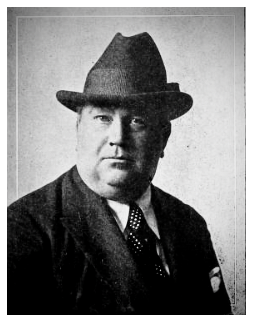
Director Lloyd B. Carleton

Lloyd B. Carleton (c. 1872–1933) started working for Carl Laemmle in the Fall of 1915. Carleton arrived with impeccable credentials, having directed some 60 films for the likes of Thanhouser, Lubin, Fox, and Selig.

Between March and December 1916, 44-year-old Lloyd Carleton directed 16 movies for Universal, starting with The Yaqui and ending with The Morals of Hilda released on December 11, 1916. Emory Johnson acted in all 16 of these films. Of Carleton's total 1916 output, 11 were feature films, and the rest were two-reel shorts. After Emory Johnson signed his Universal contract in early 1916, Carl Laemmle, the owner of Universal Pictures, thought he had found a new leading man. Laemmle was looking for a male lead like Wallace Reid. He also wanted to develop a cinematic pair that would captivate audiences.

Johnson became Laemmle's choice for his new leading man. Laemmle chose Dorothy Davenport to spark screen chemistry with Johnson. She was a Universal contract player who was Wallace Reid's wife. Universal's top director, Lloyd B. Carleton, was tasked by Laemmle to direct all of this pair's films.

The collaboration of Johnson and Davenport resulted in 13 films, beginning with the release of Doctor Neighbor in May 1916. The last film in the series was The Devil's Bondwoman, released in November 1916. The majority of the movies were feature films. All the films featured Johnson and Davenport as the main stars.

Davenport became pregnant in October 1916, and her film output dropped sharply in early 1917. In the end, Laemmle felt Johnson was not talented nor charismatic enough. He would not be Universal's version of Wally Reid. Laemmle felt that the films needed more screen chemistry, even if they made money. In June 1918, Universal failed to renew the contract of Emory Johnson.

The table below lists the 13 films Johnson and Davenport collaborated on.

◆ Films starring Emory Johnson and Dorothy Davenport in 1916 ◆
Title	Released	Director	Davenport role	Johnson role	Type	Time	LOC	Brand	Notes
Doctor Neighbor	1 May	Carleton	Hazel Rogers	Hamilton Powers	Drama	Feature	lost	Red Feather	
Her Husband's Faith	11 May	Carleton	Mabel Otto	Richard Otto	Drama	Short	lost	Universal	
Heartaches	18 May	Carleton	Virginia Payne	S Jackson Hunt	Drama	Short	lost	Universal	
Two Mothers	1 Jun	Carleton	Violetta Andree	2nd Husband	Drama	Short	lost	Universal	
Her Soul's Song	15 Jun	Carleton	Mary Salsbury	Paul Chandos	Drama	Short	lost	Universal	
The Way of the World	3 Jul	Carleton	Beatrice Farley	Walter Croyden	Drama	Feature	lost	Red Feather	
No. 16 Martin Street	13 Jul	Carleton	Cleo	Jacques Fournier	Drama	Short	lost	Universal	
A Yoke of Gold	14 Aug	Carleton	Carmen	Jose Garcia	Drama	Feature	lost	Red Feather	
The Unattainable	4 Sep	Carleton	Bessie Gale	Robert Goodman	Drama	Feature	1 of 5 reels	Bluebird	
Black Friday	18 Sep	Carleton	Elionor Rossitor	Charles Dalton	Drama	Feature	lost	Red Feather	
The Human Gamble	8 Oct	Carleton	Flavia Hill	Charles Hill	Drama	Short	lost	Universal	
Barriers of Society	10 Oct	Carleton	Martha Gorham	Westie Phillips	Drama	Feature	1 of 5 reels	Red Feather	
The Devil's Bondwoman	11 Nov	Carleton	Beverly Hope	Mason Van Horton	Drama	Feature	lost	Red Feather	

After completing this film, Carleton would make The Morals of Hilda and sever his connections with Universal.

==== Screenplay ====
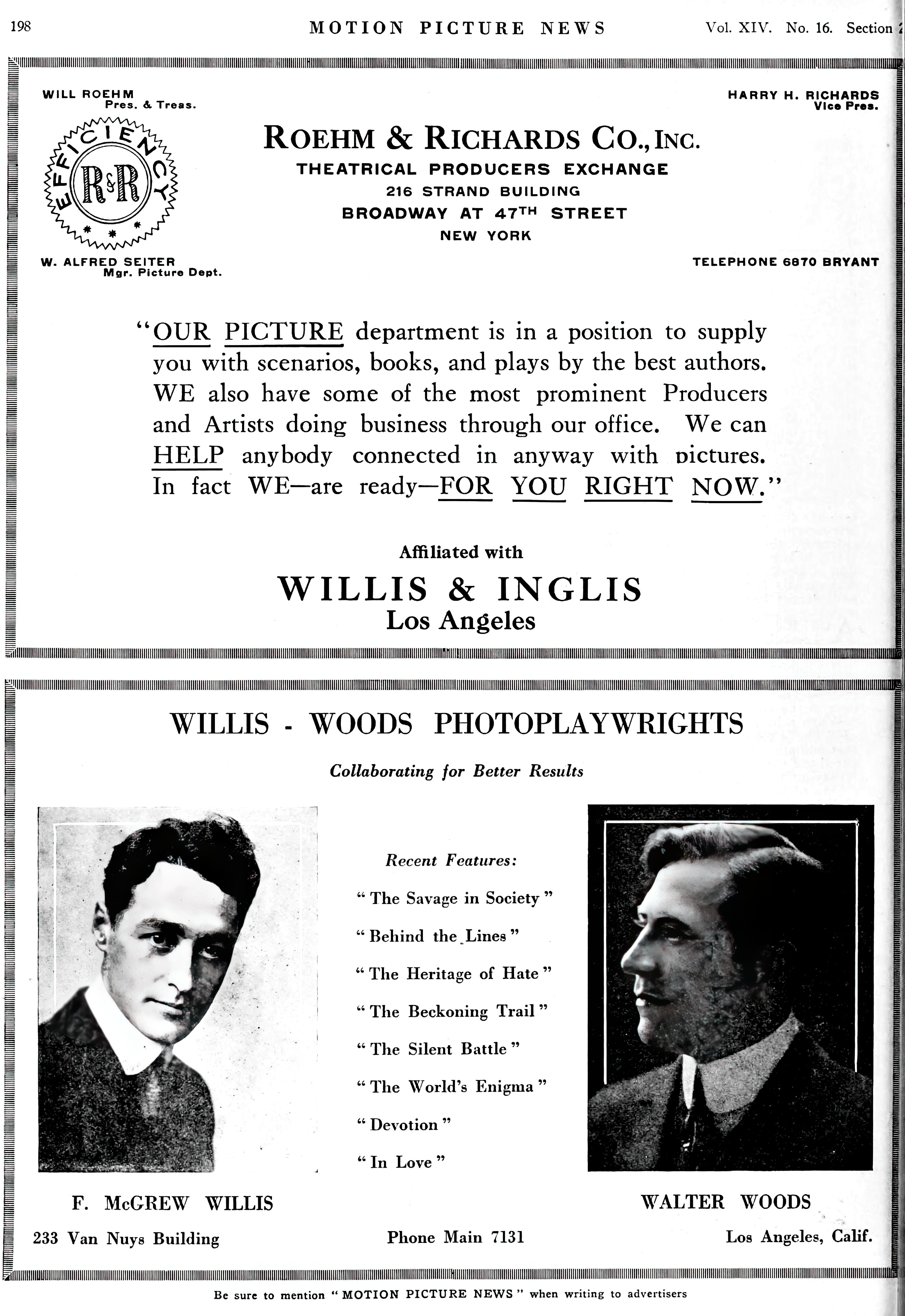
Willis Woods Ad

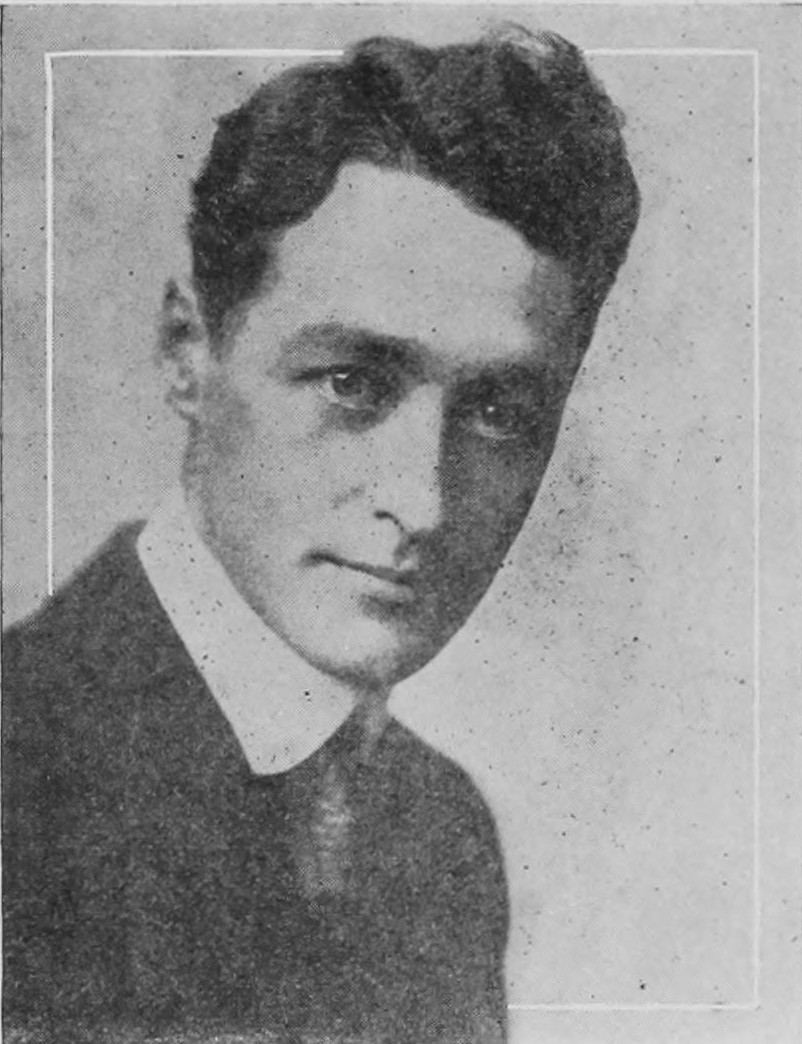
Willis

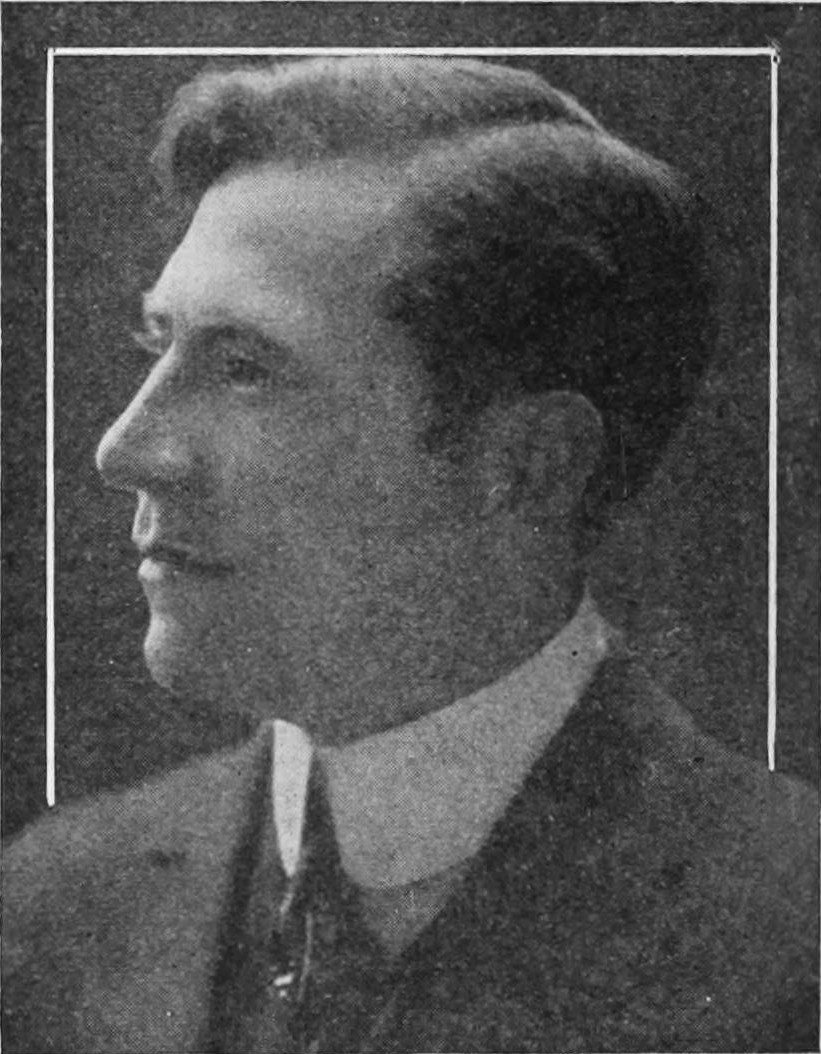
Woods

F. McGrew Willis (1891–1957) and Walter Woods (1881–1942) were scenarists. Their business advertisements in the trade journals would advertise themselves as "Willis - Woods Photoplaywrights," adding to the copy "Collaborating for Better Results." Thus, when they jointly wrote a Screenplay, they would use the pseudonym Willis Woods. The copyright for this film reads, "Credits: Willis Woods, Fred Myton." Both were contract members of the Universal cadre of screenwriters. Willis Woods also wrote A Stranger from Somewhere at the same time they wrote this story.

In the copyright descriptions of the film, the names of scenarist Maie B. Havey and author Willis Woods have been crossed out, and Willis Woods and Fred Myton are acknowledged as the story's authors. However, as stated in the Moving Picture Weekly cast list, Myton was responsible for the prologue and epilogue that made up the allegory book.

F. McGrew Willis was born Frank McGrew Willis in Pleasanton, Iowa, on August 18, 1891. He was 25 years old when he worked on this project. In 1914, after experiencing a brief stage career with various traveling companies, he became a freelance screenwriter focusing on scenarios for short films. His first screen credit for a feature film came after writing "The Quest" scenario in 1915.

Walter Woods (Walter Woods was sometimes called Walter Wood) was born in Pennsylvania on January 14, 1881. He was 35 years old when he worked on this script. Woods started as a leading man in several stock and road productions, eventually becoming a manager and director of stock productions. After he joined Universal, one of Woods's most significant projects was writing 20 two-reel episodes for the serial movie Graft. He wrote scripts for 76 films between 1915 and 1938.

=== Filming ===
On March 15, 1915, Laemmle opened the world's largest motion picture production facility, Universal City Studios. Since this film required no location shooting, it was filmed in its entirety at the new studio complex.

==== Working title ====
During the production of films, a project must have a way to be referenced. The project is given a working title. An Alternate title is another term for a Working Title. Frequently, the working title turns into the release title.

During this film's development, the working title was listed as - The Devil's Die. Later, the movie acquired another working title The Devil's Bondswoman.

=== Post production ===
==== Music ====
As part of Universal's in-house publication, The Moving Picture Weekly, a section was devoted to proposing musical selections for specific Universal movies. The musical selections were "Specially Selected and Compiled by M. Winkler." Each reel of the movie had recommendations, as shown below:

The Devil's Bondwoman
REEL I
I. "Olympia," by Ascher, until "And then was brought forth," etc.
2. "Creepy Creep," by Tyler, until "Mason Van Horton," etc.
3. "Extase," by Ganne, until "Scene: Dancing."
4. "Harlequin One-Step," by Roberts, until "Scene: Interior of office."
5. "Alia Ballerina Valse Lenton."

An image of the complete music recommendations for this film are located in the Gallery section of this page.

== Release and reception ==
=== Official release ===
The copyright was filed with U.S. Copyright Office on November 10, 1916, and entered into the record as shown: (Note: The copyright was filed with U.S. Copyright Office and entered into the record as shown. THE DEVIL'S BONDWOMAN. Red Feather.: 1916. 5 reels.; Credits: Willis Woods, Fred Myton; director, Lloyd B. Carleton; scenario, Fred Myton, © Universal Film Mfg. Co., Inc.; 10Nov16; LP9488.)

In 1916, "Red Feather" movies were always released on Mondays. This film was officially released on Monday, November 20, 1916.

=== Advertising ===
By bringing paying customers to the theater, advertising plays a critical role in ensuring the success of a movie. A successful marketing campaign generates excitement among potential stakeholders by sharing plotlines, actors, release dates, and other essential information. Theater owners gained knowledge that helped them make better booking choices in a competitive market. Alongside a movie's advertising campaign, Carl Laemmle introduced an added feature to aid potential stakeholders in choosing to watch or lease the film.

Universal pioneered the classification of feature films by production cost in 1916, making it the first Hollywood studio to do so. One of the reasons behind this move was that the "Big Five" film studios owned their own movie houses, enabling them to have guaranteed outlets for their entertainment products. In contrast to the majors, Universal did not have ownership of theaters or theater chains. By branding Universal-produced feature films, theater owners would have an added tool to evaluate films for leasing. At the same time, fans could use it to determine which movies they prefer to see. (Note: Universal formed a three-tier branding system for their feature films based on the size of their budget and status. In the book "The Universal Story," the author Clive Hirschhorn describes the feature movie branding as: Red Feather Photoplays – low-budget feature films; Bluebird Photoplays – mainstream feature release and more ambitious productions; Jewel – prestige motion pictures featuring high budgets using prominent actors; In 1917, the Butterfly line, a grade between Red Feather and Bluebird, was introduced. During the following two years, half of Universal's feature film output was in the Red Feather and Butterfly categories. However, this was during a time when stars increasingly took the spotlight in advertising. The branding tags seemly ignored that the ticket-buying audience attended movies to see their favorite stars, not the vehicle allowing them to perform. The branding system had a brief existence, and by 1920, had faded away.)

Universal's trade journal, The Moving Picture Weekly, features an advertising section called "PUTTING IT OVER." Exhibitors would receive suggestions from Universal on how to advertise specific movies. The November 11, 1916, issue had the following advertising suggestions for this movie:

"THE RED FEATHER for November 20 is called 'The Devil's Bondwoman.' Mephisto costumes are easy to obtain. It would be very effective to have a regular operatic Mephistopheles in red clothes, a short cape, pointed shoes, and a cap with a standing feather, dragging a handsomely dressed woman chained by the wrists to him. This could be used as a lobby tableau vivant or posed on the stage in front of your screen while the lights in the house are up, with appropriate placards giving the release date."

=== Reviews ===
The magazine movie critics generally panned this movie.
In the November 25, 1916 issue of the Motion Picture News, Peter Milne writes:

One is led to believe that too many scenario writers spoiled " The Devil's Bondwoman." Take, for instance, the allegoricals, which include several flashes of the lower regions. These have little to do with the story proper, and the picture would be better if they were eliminated. The main plot is of a common-place sort and is not founded on basically convincing situations. Lloyd B. Carleton's direction falls quite far below the standard he usually maintains. The double exposures and dissolves are not well done. The exteriors were chosen with little care, and the interiors are not appropriate. Adele Farrington is an unconvincing vampire and over-acts so strenuously that one can never take her appearances seriously.

In the November 22, 1916 issue of The New York Clipper, the staff critic opines:

A conventional, rather uninteresting "movie" with the usual plot ingredients. The picture shows a lack of care in its production and want of originality by its several authors. While the leads do all possible with the unconvincing roles assigned them, the rest of the cast is inclined to overplay. There is not enough body to the story proper to warrant the filming of five reels, and the introduction of the allegorical scenes showing glimpses of Hades adds nothing to the tale, Taken all in all. this picture falls far below the standard set for meritorious features of the present day.

== Preservation status ==
Many silent-era films did not survive for reasons as explained on this Wikipedia page. (Note: Film is history. With every foot of film lost, we lose a link to our culture, the world around us, each other, and ourselves. – Martin Scorsese, filmmaker, director NFPF Board A report by Library of Congress film historian and archivist David Pierce estimates that: around 75% of original silent-era films have perished; 14% of the 10,919 silent films released by major studios exist in their original 35 mm or other formats; 11% survive only in full-length foreign versions or film formats of lesser image quality.) According to the Library of Congress, all known copies of this film are lost.

== Gallery ==
The Players
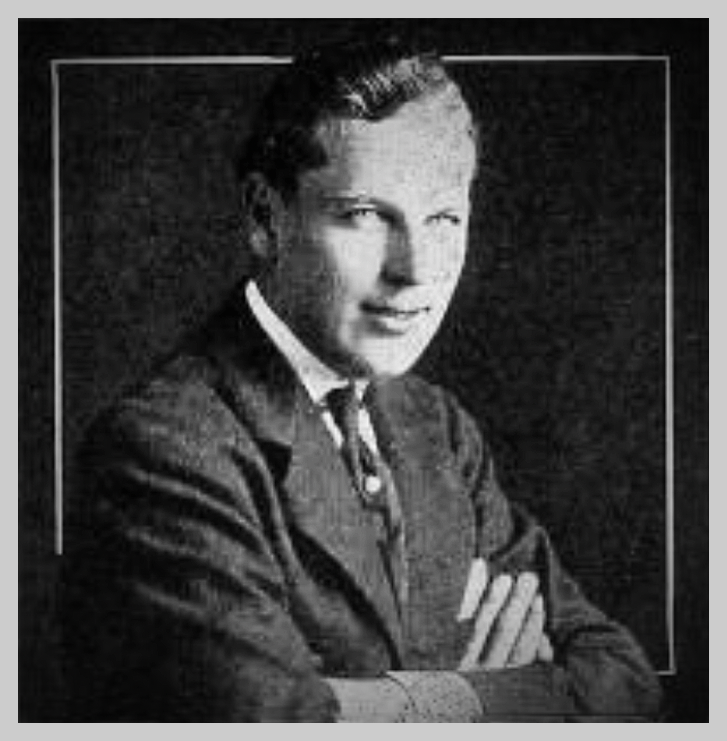
Emory Johnson in 1916
Mason Van Horton

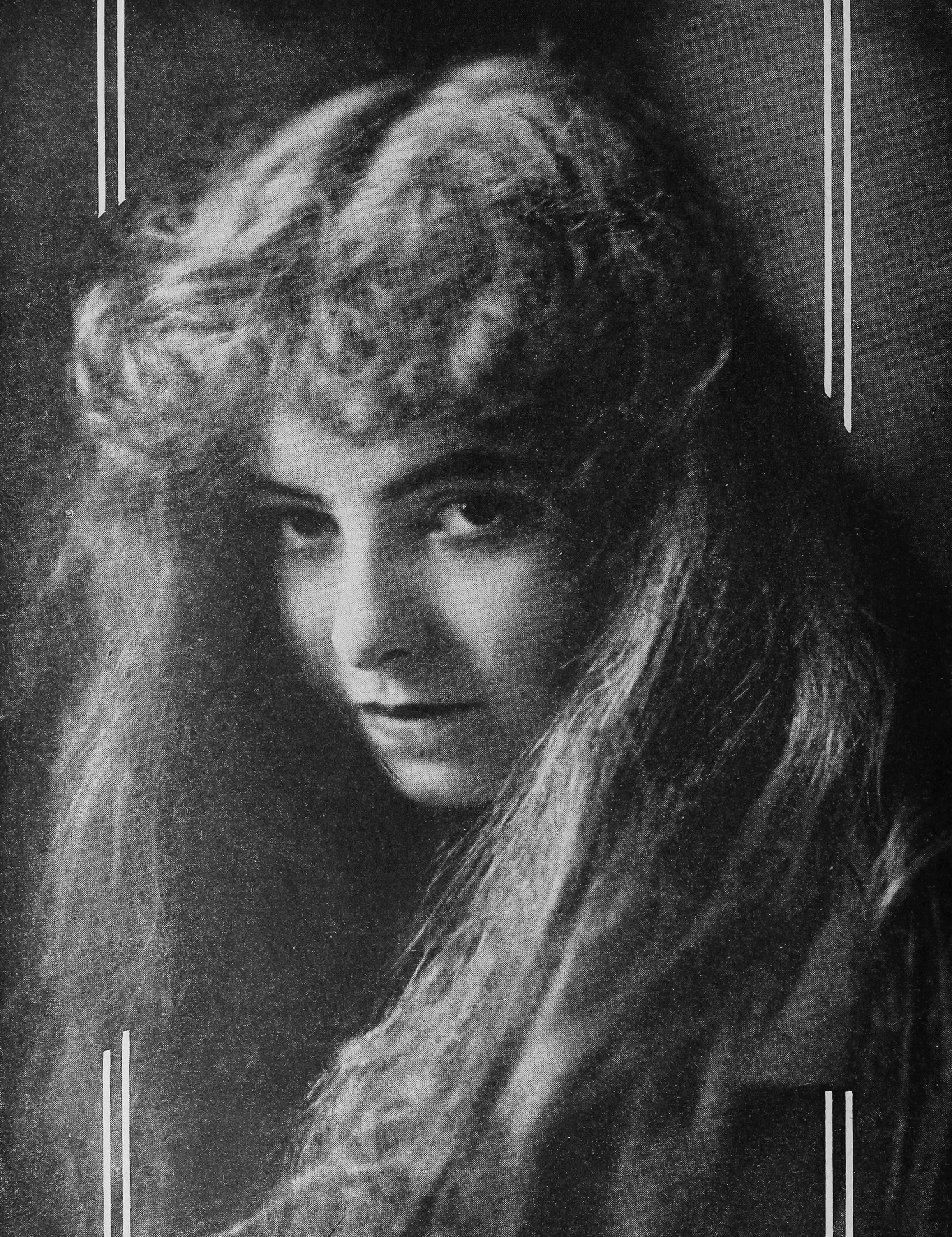
Dorothy Davenport in 1914
Beverly Hope

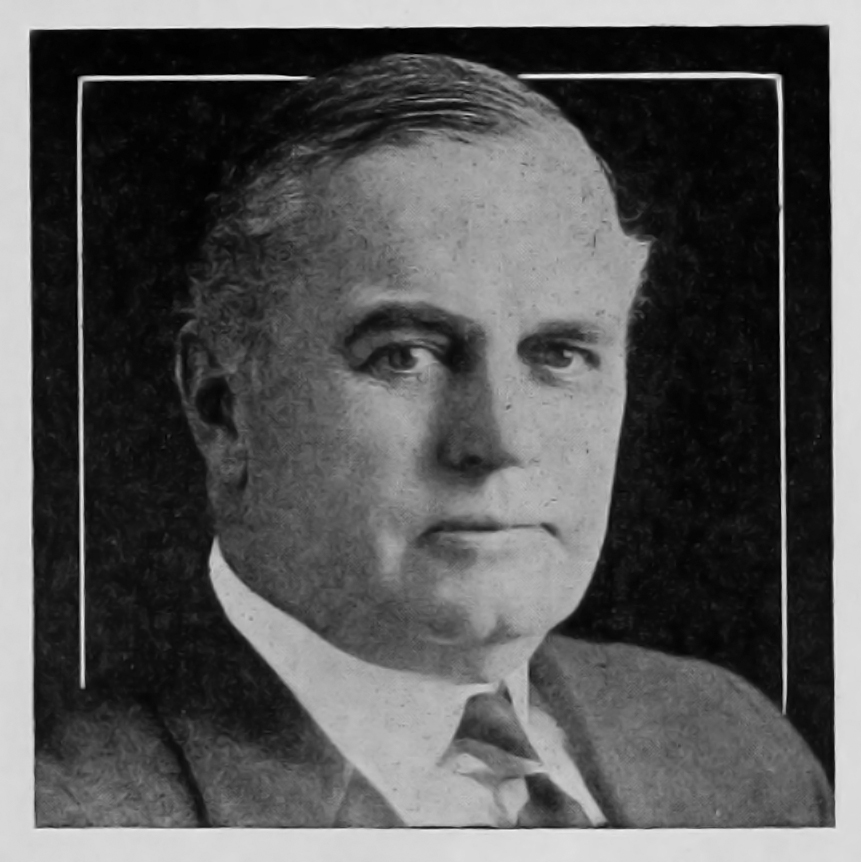
Richard Morris in 1916
Prince Vandloup

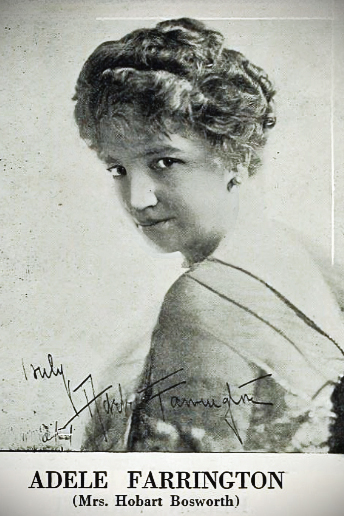
Adele Farrington in 1916
Doria Manners

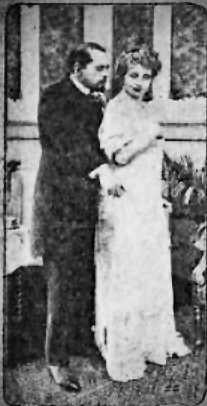
Doria and the Prince

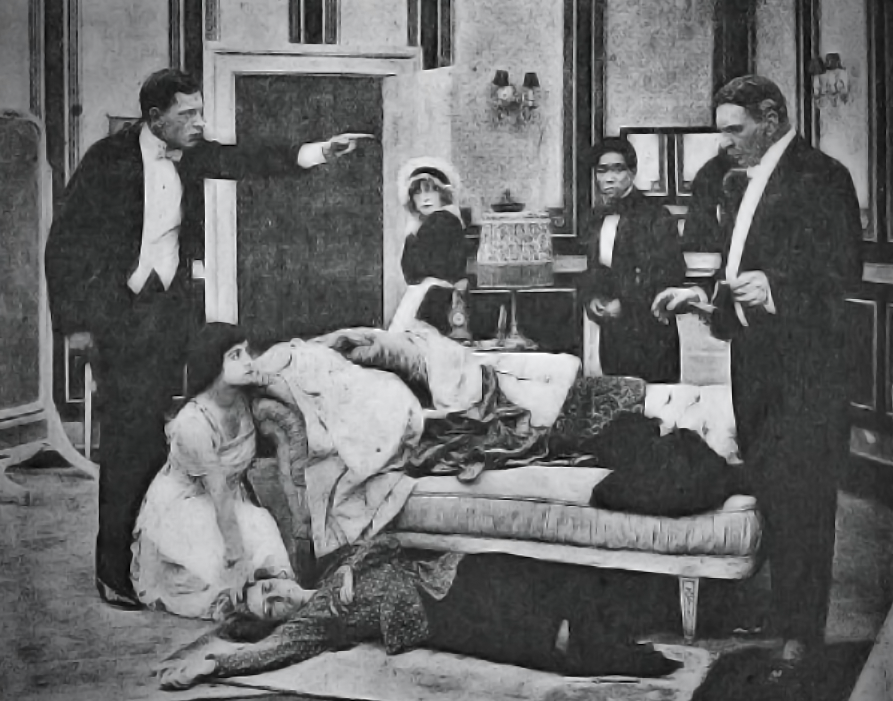
The ruined woman stabs herself in Doria's room

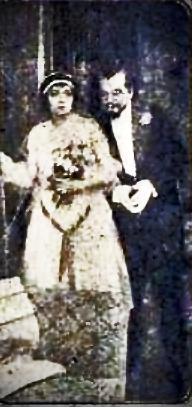
The Prince meets Beverly

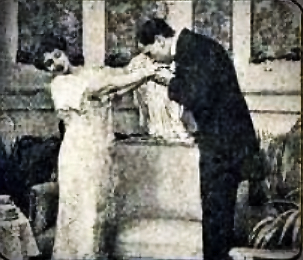
Doria receives Mason

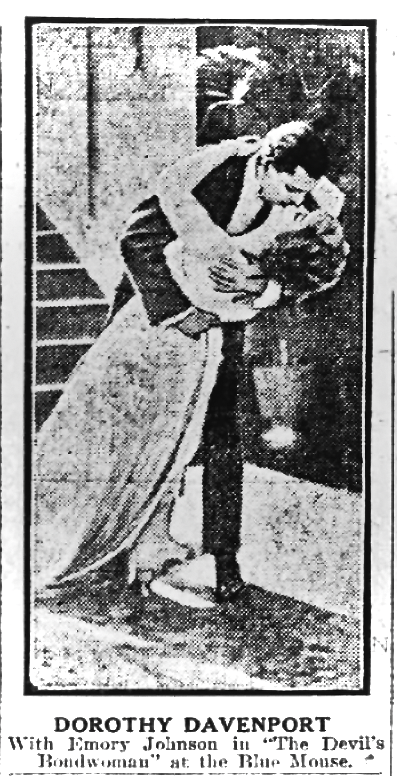
Beverly and Mason exchange a kiss

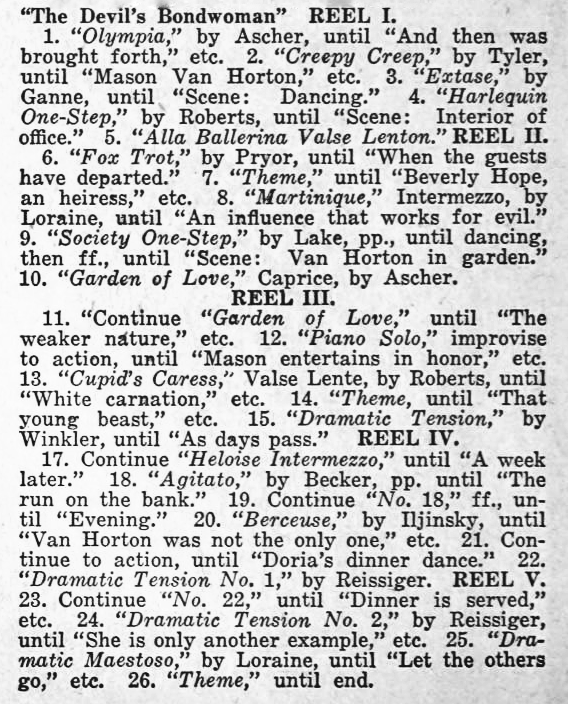
Recommended movie music

== Sources ==
- Braff, R.E. (1999). The Universal Silents: A Filmography of the Universal Motion Picture Manufacturing Company, 1912-1929. McFarland. ISBN 978-0-7864-0287-8.
- Fleming, E.J. (2010). Wallace Reid: The Life and Death of a Hollywood Idol. McFarland. ISBN 978-0-7864-8266-5.
- Hirschhorn, Clive (1983). The Universal Story - The Complete History of the Studio and its 2,641 films. New York: Crown Publishing Group. pp. 22–23. ISBN 0-517-55001-6.
- Keil, C.; Stamp, S. (2004). American Cinema's Transitional Era: Audiences, Institutions, Practices. ACLS Humanities E-Book. University of California Press. ISBN 978-0-520-24027-8.
