= Helen Wright (actress) =

American actress

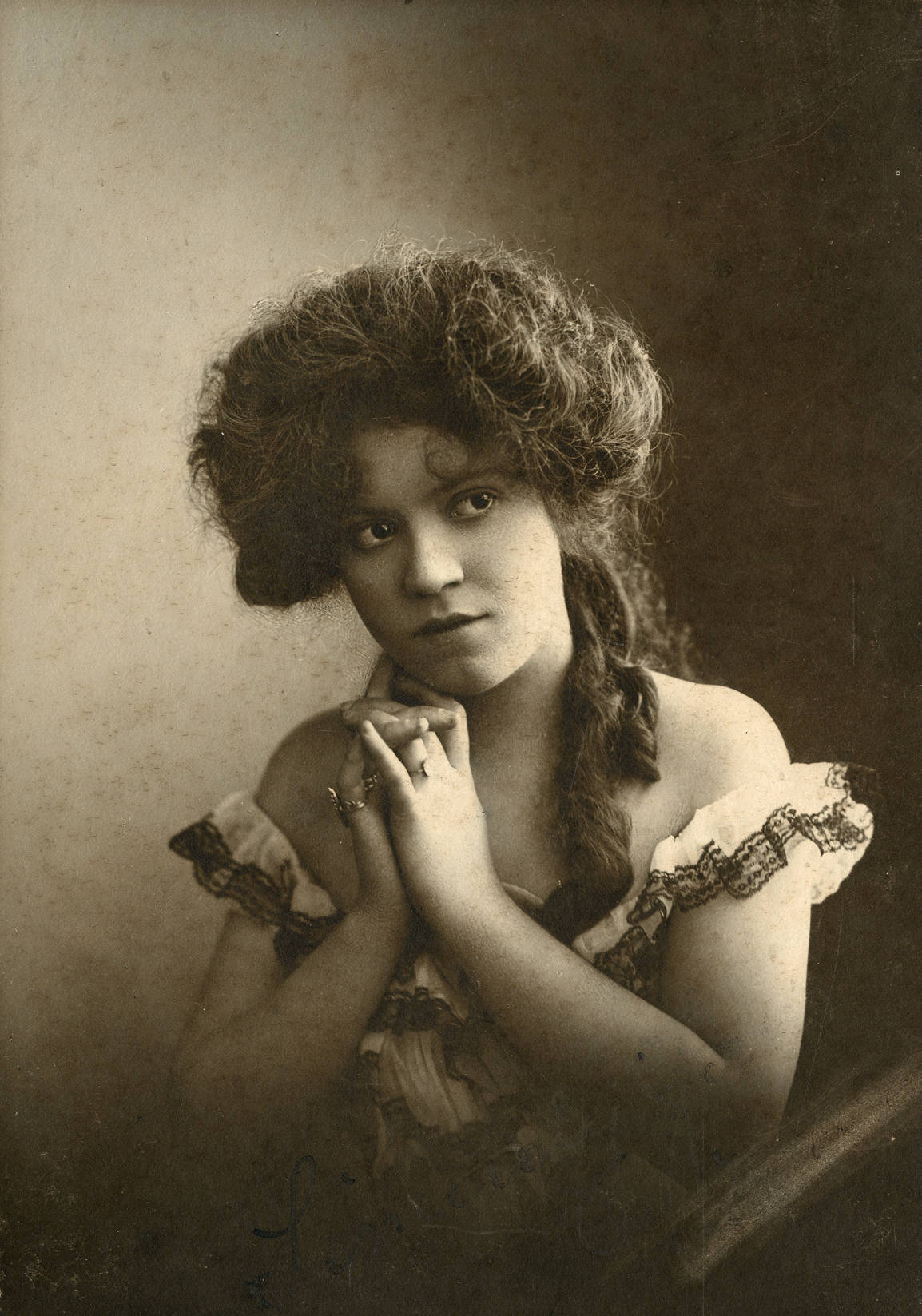
- Helen Wright in 1910
- Born: Helen Dyer Boyd; November 19, 1868; St. Paul, Minnesota, US
- Died: March 24, 1928 (aged 59); California, US
- Occupation: Actress
- Years active: 1915–1930
- Known for: A Stranger from Somewhere (1916)

Helen Wright (born Helen Boyd) was an American character actress who appeared on the stage and screen during Hollywood's silent era. She spent most of her career under contract at Universal.

== Biography ==
Wright came from St. Paul, Minnesota, and she attended a women's seminary in Chicago. She acted with the Otis Turner Universal Company and the Wang Company.

== Selected filmography ==
- The Mistress of Shenstone (1921)
- That Something (1920)
- The Speed Maniac (1919)
- The Brass Bullet (1918)
- Her One Mistake (1918)
- The Lash of Power (1917)
- Sirens of the Sea (1917)
- Triumph (1917)
- The Lash of Power (1917)
- The Car of Chance (1917)
- A Doll's House (1917)
- The Field of Honor (1917)
- Polly Redhead (1917)
- A Stranger from Somewhere (1916)
- The Morals of Hilda (1916)
- Is Any Girl Safe? (1916)
- Heartaches (1916)
- The Scarlet Sin (1915)
- Heritage (1915)
- Under the Crescent (1915)
- The Black Box (1915)
- Damon and Pythias (1914)
