= Damon and Pythias (1914 film) =

1914 film

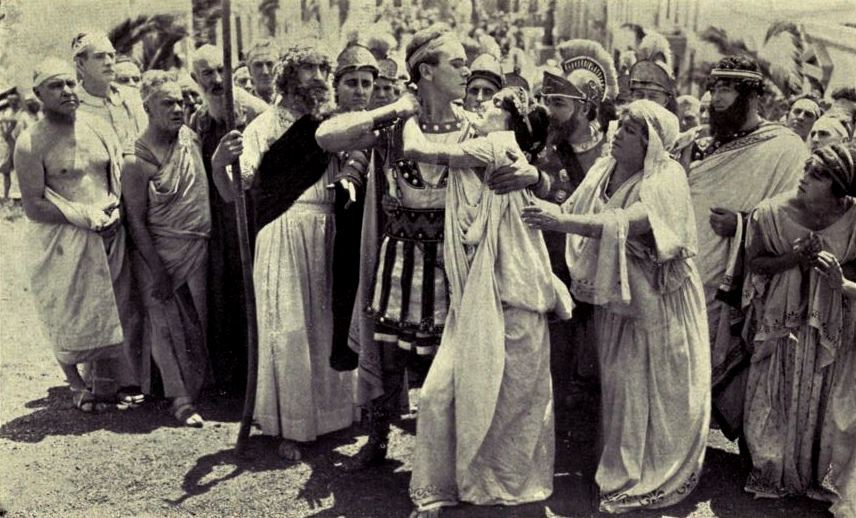
- Directed by: Otis Turner
- Written by: Ruth Ann Baldwin; James Dayton; Allan Dwan
- Produced by: Carl Laemmle
- Starring: William Worthington; Herbert Rawlinson; Cleo Madison
- Cinematography: Albert Warren Kelsey
- Production company: Universal Pictures
- Distributed by: Universal Pictures
- Release date: November 23, 1914
- Running time: 100 minutes
- Country: United States
- Language: Silent (English intertitles)

Damon and Pythias is a 1914 American silent epic film directed by Otis Turner and starring William Worthington, Herbert Rawlinson, and Cleo Madison. It is based on the Greek legend of Damon and Pythias set during the reign of Dionysius I of Syracuse. It was an ambitious production by Universal Pictures, made at a time when feature films were rapidly replacing short films as the leading format in cinema. For much of the opening reel the cast are introduced, appearing in their modern dress rather than historical costumes.

An earlier short film adaptation of the legend was produced in 1908, also directed by Otis Turner. It was adapted again under the same title, Damon and Pythias, in 1962.

== Cast ==
- William Worthington as Damon
- Herbert Rawlinson as Pythias
- Cleo Madison as Hermione
- Ann Little as Calanthee
- Frank Lloyd as Dionysius
- Helen Wright as Arria
- Chandler House as Son of Damon
- Harry Davenport as Phillistus
- Duke Worne as Luculus
- Edgar Keller as Democles
- Bruce Mitchell as Perocles
- Lon Chaney as Wild Man (uncredited)
- Carmen Phillips as Extra (uncredited)
- Hal Roach as Extra (uncredited)

== Preservation ==
Complete prints of Damon and Pythias are held by the Library of Congress and the George Eastman Museum in Rochester, New York.

== Bibliography ==
- Bowser, Eileen. The Transformation of Cinema, 1907-1915. University of California Press, 1994. ISBN 978-0-520-08534-3
- McCaffrey, Donald W. & Jacobs, Christopher P. Guide to the Silent Years of American Cinema. Greenwood Publishing, 1999. ISBN 0-313-30345-2
