= The Speed Maniac =

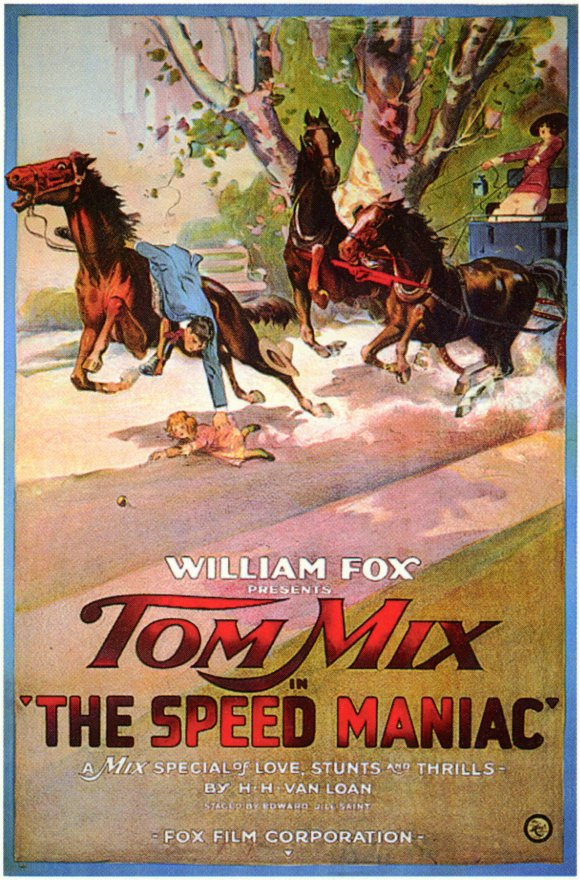
- Directed by: Edward LeSaint
- Written by: Denison Clift; H. H. Van Loan
- Produced by: William Fox
- Starring: Tom Mix
- Cinematography: Fred LeRoy Granville
- Distributed by: Fox Film Corporation
- Release date: October 19, 1919
- Running time: 5 reels
- Country: USA

The Speed Maniac is a lost 1919 American silent action drama film directed by Edward LeSaint and starring Tom Mix and Eva Novak. It was produced and distributed by Fox Film Corporation.

== Cast ==
- Tom Mix - Billy Porter
- Eva Novak - Pearl Matthews
- Charles K. French - John B. Prescott
- Hayward Mack - Philip Malcolm
- Lee Shumway - Knockout McCluskey
- Helen Wright - Mary
- Jack Curtis - Red Morgan
- Georgie Stone - Jim McCluskey
- George Hackathorne - Tom Matthews
- Charles Hill Mailes - John Matthews
- Ernest Shields - Cigarette Keefe
- Buck Jones - (*as Buck Gebhart)
