= The Lash of Power =

- Directed by: Harry Solter
- Written by: J. Grubb Alexander; Fred Myton
- Starring: Kenneth Harlan; Carmel Myers; Helen Wright
- Cinematography: Roy H. Klaffki
- Production company: Universal Pictures
- Distributed by: Universal Pictures
- Release date: November 5, 1917
- Running time: 50 minutes
- Country: United States
- Languages: Silent; English intertitles

The Lash of Power is a 1917 American silent drama film directed by Harry Solter and starring Kenneth Harlan, Carmel Myers and Helen Wright.

== Cast ==
- Kenneth Harlan as John Rand
- Carmel Myers as Marion Sherwood
- Helen Wright as Mrs. C.W. Sherwood
- Charles Hill Mailes as Charles W. Sherwood
- T.D. Crittenden as Rex Reynolds
- Jack Nelson as Oliver Mullen
- Gertrude Astor as Phyllis Ward

== Bibliography ==
- Michael Slade Shull. Radicalism in American Silent Films, 1909-1929: A Filmography and History. McFarland, 2015.
