= A Stranger from Somewhere =

1916 film directed by William Worthington

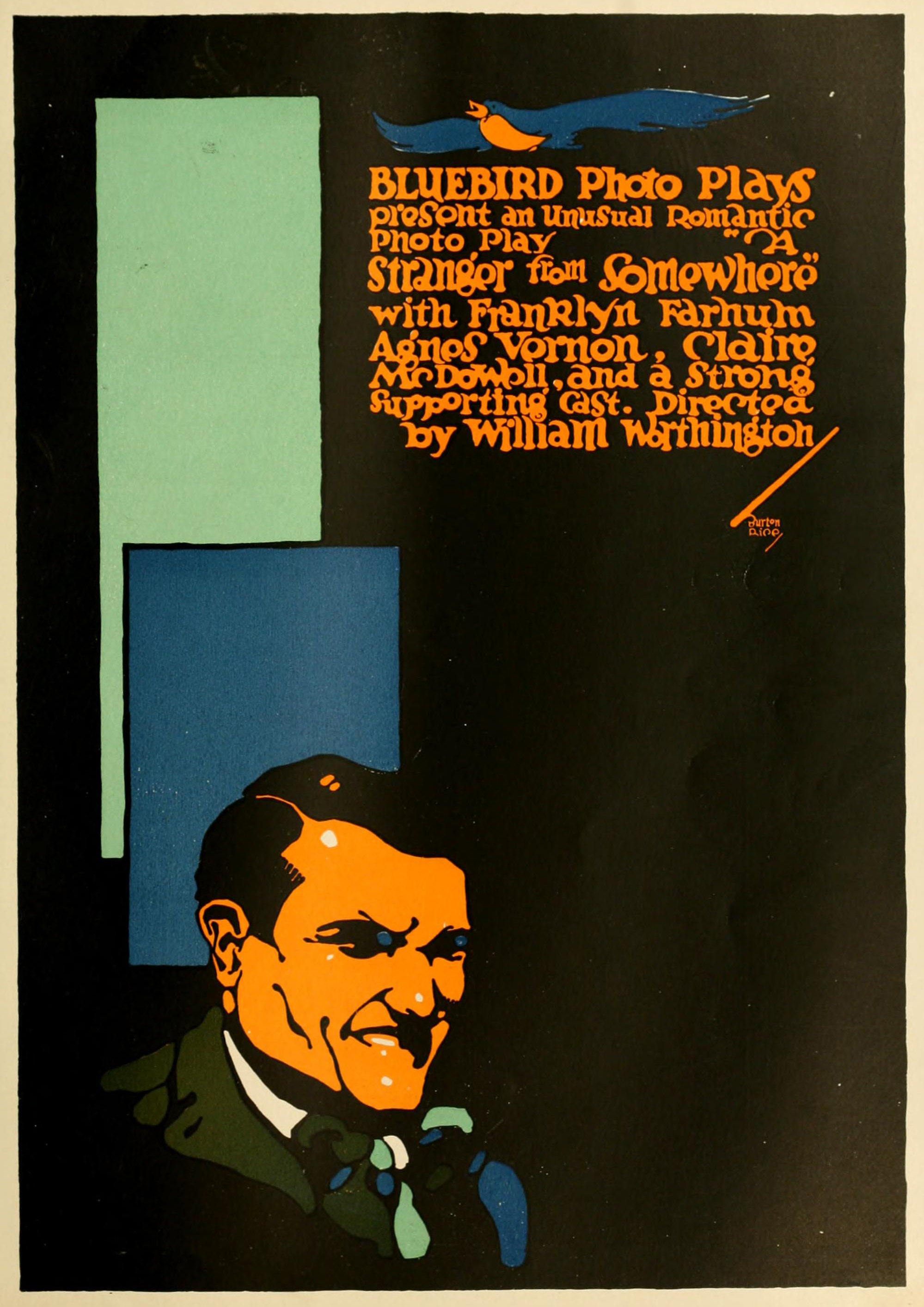
- Advertisement in The Moving Picture World (October 1916)
- Directed by: William Worthington
- Written by: Willis Woods
- Produced by: Universal Pictures
- Starring: Franklyn Farnum; Agnes Vernon
- Cinematography: Friend Baker
- Production company: Bluebird Photoplays
- Distributed by: Universal Pictures
- Release date: November 13, 1916 (USA)
- Running time: 50 minutes
- Country: United States
- Languages: Silent; English intertitles

A Stranger from Somewhere is a 1916 silent film directed by William Worthington. Universal's Bluebird Photoplays division produced and distributed the film. The movie featured Franklyn Farnum (playing a dual role), Agnes Vernon, Barney Furey, and Claire McDowell. The screenplay was written by F. McGrew Willis and Walter Woods, who were credited under the pseudonym Willis Woods.

The story revolves around a Westerner named Sam Brockton. The hero becomes disillusioned with frontier life. He sells his ranch, making him an instant millionaire. He moves to the city, seeking a new way of life, but soon becomes disenchanted with his life's choices. A fortuitous event presents itself, and he meets a young heiress, Grace Darling. They immediately fall in love.

Meanwhile, he unwittingly becomes entangled with a gang of swindlers who plot to separate him from his wealth. The crook's machinations take twists and turns until culminating in a dramatic confrontation at the Darling mansion. Brockton enters a climactic knock-down-drag-out brawl with the scammers. The police show up in the nick of time, haul the criminals to jail, and restore the peace. Brockton and Grace Darling live happily ever after.

The film was released on November 13, 1916, by Universal.

== Plot ==
Sam Brockton owns a ranch but has become disenchanted with frontier life. He sells his property and moves to New York. While driving in the country, Brockton encounters a car with a blown tire. He pulls up and offers to help. While changing the tire, Brockton catches his first glimpse of young Agnes Darling. When the front tire blew, the beautiful heiress and her father were traveling to town from their summer retreat. Brockton is smitten, and she seems interested in him. After completing the repairs, the Darlings thanked Brockton and drove away.

Olga Veloski and Howard Dana are two local swindlers passing the time on a hotel veranda. They witness Darling's mishap. The pair is aware of the wealth of Darling and Brockton. The swindlers know local millionaires shutter their homes and head to the country in the Summer. Knowing Darling's mansion is unoccupied, the crooks plan a badger game. After Darling's drive away, Olga approaches the love-struck Brockton. She weaves a story about her good friend Agnes Darling. Olga claims Agnes is stopping by her home tomorrow. Olga tells Brockton that she could introduce him to the heiress. Brockton readily agrees.

The next day, the sharpers arrive at the unoccupied Darling mansion, followed by Brockton. Olga makes excuses for Agnes's delay and then suggests they play poker while they wait. Sam agrees, and the schemers bilk Brockton out of a large sum of money. However, he hands the fraudsters a Michigan roll. During their con game, Olga notices Brockton's resemblance to an acquaintance named Dippy Lewis.

Shortly after finishing their con game, the Darlings appear at their mansion. They find a bewildered Brockton and believe he is a burglar. Brockton clarifies what transpired while Olga and Dana hide. The Darlings feel sorry for Brockton and invite him to join them at a mountain hotel. The swindlers hear the invitation and then make their escape. After their departure, Olga recalls how a Dippy bore such a close resemblance to Brockton. The swindlers join their friend "Dippy Lewis" and dream up a new plan to have Dippy impersonate Brockton. Their idea is to send Dippy to the hotel in Brockton's place to woo Agnes Darling, believing she will fall in love and marry him. Dippy arrives at the hotel. Although Dippy has an uncouth manner about him, he begins his courtship. Agnes tells Dippy she has arranged for them to go horseback riding. After a while, Agnes observes he can barely ride a horse. She has doubts about his background story of life on the frontier—utterly discouraged, Dippy returns to the lodge. After his arrival, Dippy filches many of the guests of their valuables. When the guests notice the missing items, they call the police. The police show up and investigate while the thieves gather their loot and escape.

Olga needs to ensure the real Brockton does not appear at the hotel while Dippy runs his con game. Olga instructs her gang to chloroform the real Brockton, then dispose of him in a cellar. Dippy turns up at the wrong time, and they chloroform Dippy instead. Unbeknownst to the crooks, the real Brockton has already departed for the hotel. The real Brockton arrives at the hotel unaware of previous events. Still bothered about his poor manners and horsemanship, Agnes coldly greets him. The dejected Brockton is about to leave when he sees a couple of horses. He soothes the animals and then takes one for a short ride. Besides demonstrating his riding skills, it amazed Agnes how gentlemanly he had become. Agnes renews her interest in Brockton.

Brockton is about to propose to Agnes when he sees Olga and Dana. The con artists, believing Brockton is Dippy, encourage him to propose marriage to Agnes. Brockton proposes, and Agnes promises to marry him. Still thinking Brockton is Dippy, the hustlers discuss how they will divide the stolen loot. Agnes overhears this conversation and becomes exasperated. She confronts Brockton and invites him to meet her in the city to straighten out this mess. After Agnes leaves, Brockton berates the miscreants while claiming ignorance about their caper. Olga realizes that Brockton is not Dippy. Agnes and Olga return to the city on the same train, where Olga believes she hears Agnes planning an elopement. Once in the town, Olga knows she must quickly locate Dippy. Olga finds a trapped Dippy and releases him. She tells him to hurry to the Darling mansion since he must elope with Agnes before the Brockton arrives. Olga tells Dippy they will meet him at the estate.

The Black hats show up at the mansion. When Dippy cannot persuade Agnes to elope, they decide to kidnap Agnes. Brockton arrives and senses Agnes's predicament. A fight breaks out between Brockton and the crooks. During the melee, Agnes breaks free and calls the police. The police arrive and arrest the bad guys. Sam Brockton explains everything to Agnes. They rediscover their love for each other, marry, and live happily ever after.

== Cast ==
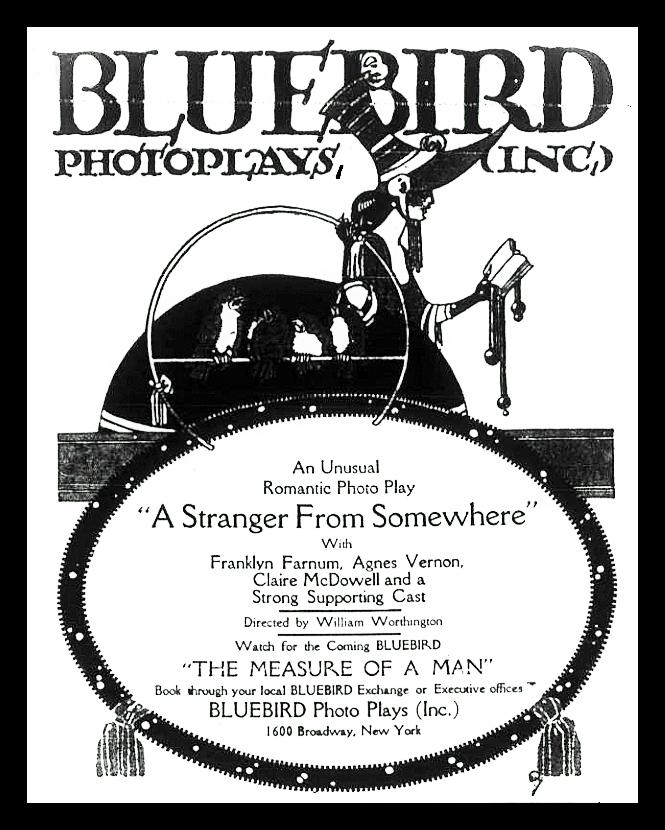
Actor	Role
Franklyn Farnum	Sam Brockton / 'Dippy' Lewis
Agnes Vernon	Agnes Darling
Claire McDowell	Olga Veloski
Barney Furey	Howard Dana
Arthur Hoyt	Daniel Darling
Helen Wright	Mrs. D. G. Darling

== Production ==
=== Pre production ===
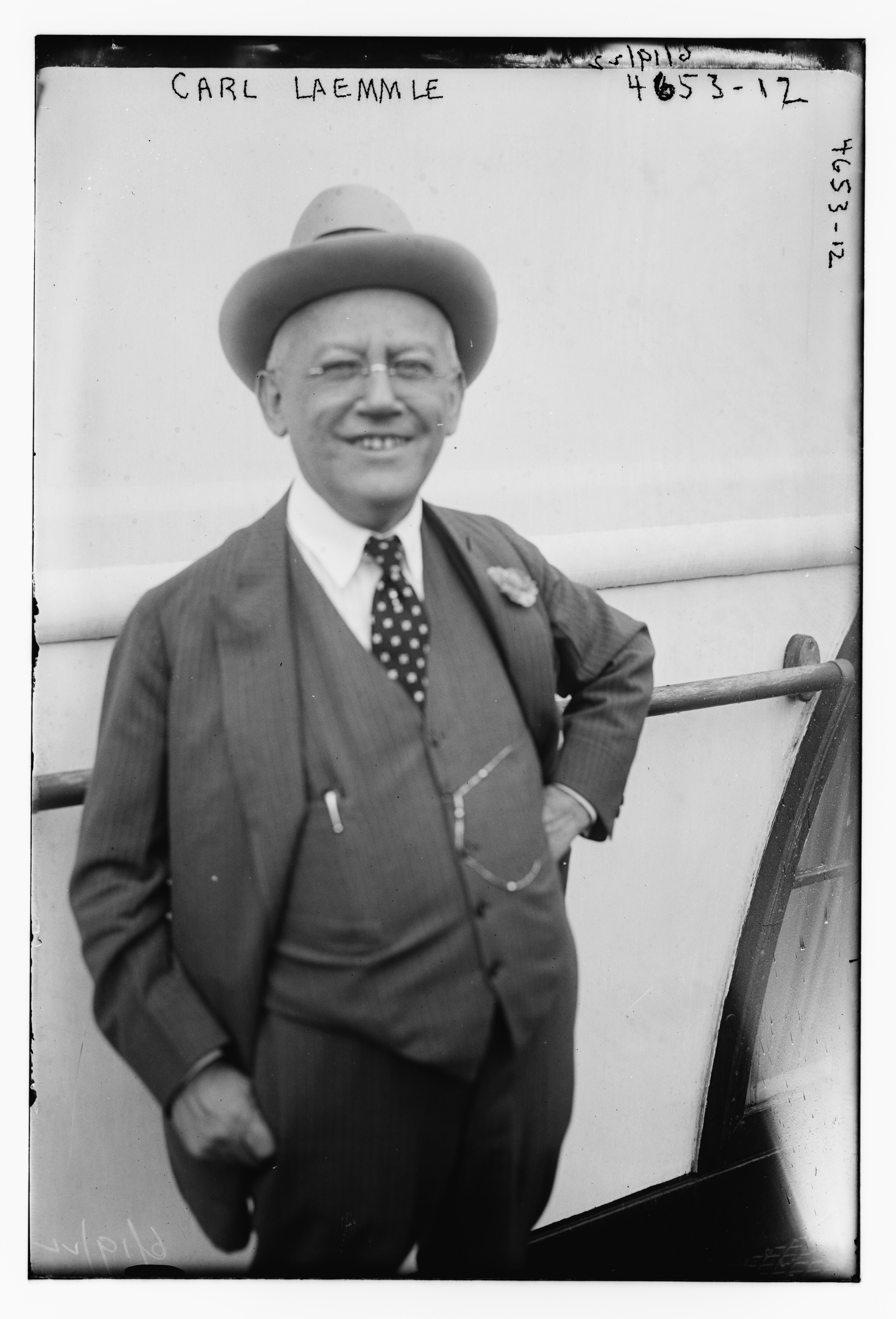
Carl Laemmle in 1918

Universal Logo 1915

In the book, "American Cinema's Transitional Era," the authors point out, The years between 1908 and 1917 witnessed what may have been the most significant transformation in American film history. During this "transitional era," widespread changes affected film form and film genres, filmmaking practices and industry structure, exhibition sites, and audience demographics. One aspect of this transition was the longer duration of films. Feature films (Note: A "feature film" or "feature-length film" is a narrative film (motion picture or "movie") with a running time long enough to be considered the principal or sole presentation in a commercial entertainment program. A film can be distributed as a feature film if it equals or exceeds a specified minimum running time and satisfies other defined criteria. The minimum time depends on the governing agency. The American Film Institute and the British Film Institute require films to have a minimum running time of forty minutes or longer. Other film agencies, e.g.,Screen Actors Guild, require a film's running time to be at least 60 minutes. Currently, most feature films are between 70 and 210 minutes long.) were slowly becoming the standard fare for Hollywood producers. Before 1913, you could count the yearly features on two hands. Between 1915 and 1916, the number of feature movies rose 2 ½ times, or from 342 films to 835. There was a recurring claim that Carl Laemmle was the longest-running studio chief resisting the production of feature films. Universal was not ready to downsize its short film business because short films were cheaper, faster, and more profitable to produce than feature films. (Note: " Short Film" - There are no defined parameters for a Short film except for one immutable rule -the film's maximum running time. The Academy of Motion Picture Arts and Sciences defines a short film as "an original motion picture that has a running time of 40 minutes or less, including all credits".)

Laemmle would continue to buck this trend while slowly increasing his output of features. In 1914, Laemmle published an essay titled - Doom of long Features Predicted. In 1915, Laemmle ran an advertisement extolling Bluebird films while adding the following vocabulary on the top of the ad. (Note: The moving picture business is here to stay. That you must admit, despite carping critics and blundering sore-heads, true, some exhibitors have found business so good lately — but if you get down to facts when you look for a reason why, it's a 100 to 1 shot that they are, and for some time have been, dallying with a feature program. Some of these wise ones will tell you that business has picked up since they went into features, — BUT — ask them whether they are talking NET or GROSS. They will find they have an immediate appointment and terminate your queries unceremoniously. Funny how we like to kid ourselves, isn't it? The man who is packing 'em in and losing money on features is envied by his competitor, who is laying by a bit every day, and has a good steady, dependable patronage but admits to a few vacant seats at some performances. When this chap wakes up, he will realize that he has a gold mine and that good advertising will make it produce to capacity. The moral is that if you can tie up to the Universal Program, DO IT. If you can't NOW, watch your first chance. Let the people know what you have, and let the feature man go on to ruin if he wants to. You should worry! Motion Picture News - May 6, 1916)

Universal released ninety-one feature films in 1916 including fifty-four Bluebird films. (Note: What is Universal Branding — Major film studios owned many movie houses. This gave them guaranteed outlets for their products. Since Universal owned no theaters, they needed a solution to advise exhibitors on the type of movie they received. Universal responded by forming a three-tier branding system for their films based on the size of their budget and status. In the book "The Universal Story," Hirschhorn describes the branding as "the low budget, Red Feather programmers, the more ambitious Bluebird releases, and the occasional Prestige or Jewel production." An article in The Moving Picture World explains the Bluebird moniker - we adopted the name of Bluebird Photoplays because this company is the harbinger of the very best that can be produced in features. A "Motography" article dated April 28, 1917, announced - A new brand of feature photoplays will be offered for release, though Universal exchanges under the brand name of Butterfly Pictures. The Bluebird and Butterfly branding was the brainchild of Carl Laemmle, and both brands reflected his faddish philosophy of "... THE PLAY is always greater than the star". This branding was Laemmle's rather blatant attempt to blunt the proliferation of the star system he had created. Laemmle's filmmaking perspective did not last long. The ticket-buying audience he served went to the movies to see their favorite stars, not the vehicle allowing them to perform. The branding system had a brief existence and by 1920 had faded away.)

==== Casting ====
- Franklyn Farnum (1878 - 1961) was born William Franklyn Smith on June 5, 1878, in Boston, Massachusetts. The 38 year-old actor would play the dual roles of Sam Brockton and Dippy Lewis. William Smith became a vaudevillian at age twelve and started acting on the stage in 1903. Early in his career, he decided William Smith was not a proper stage name. A local cub reporter suggested he change his name to Franklyn Farnum, cashing in on the last name of the stage and screen actors Dustin and William Farnum. He changed his last name to Farnum and used his middle name as his first name. Farnum was a stage actor who appeared in several theatrical productions, including Broadway, before becoming a silent-screen actor. This film was the third picture he made in his movie career. He would wind up acting in over four hundred films. He was unrelated to the brothers and silent-screen actors, Dustin Farnum, William Farnum, and Marshall Farnum. Refer to the section Myths on this page.
- Agnes Vernon (1895 - 1948) was born on December 27, 1895, in La Grande, Oregon. The 20 year-old actor would play Agnes Darling, the young heiress to the Darling fortune. Starting in 1914, Vernon had acted in seventy-one short films films before taking on this role. This movie was Vernon's first feature film and her first film with Farnum. Farnum would become Vernon's introduction to comedy. This Bluebird release would be the only feature film Vernon made in 1916. During her career, Vernon would star in sixteen feature films. Franklyn Farnum would be the leading man in five of these projects. After completing this film, Vernon made her second film with Farnum, the short film "Little Partner." The film was released on December 19, 1916. During Vernon's movie career, her professional relationship with director Worthington produced twenty-two films, including six feature films.
- Claire McDowell (1877 - 1966) was born on November 2, 1877, in New York City. The 39 year-old actress would play the villainess, Olga Veloski. She had appeared in over seventy short films before her appearance in this movie. This would be her first feature and her first bluebird film. She would headline in her next Universal film - the Red Feather production of "Mixed Blood" released on December 18, 1916
- " Barney Furey" (1886 - 1938) was born Charles Manford Furey on September 7, 1886, in Boise, Idaho. He was 30 year-old actor when he played the villain, Howard Dana. Furey was active in films from 1912 to 1937.
- " Arthur Hoyt" (1874 - 1953) was born on March 19, 1874, in Georgetown, Colorado. He was 42 years-old actor when he played Grace Darling's father, Daniel Darling. Hoyt made his Broadway debut in 1905 and his final Broadway appearance in 1911. He made his first film in 1914 and his last in 1947. During his acting career, he was a Character actor who was usually cast in supporting roles and appeared in more than 275 films, including silents and talkies.
- " Helen Wright" (1868 - 1928) was born Helen Boyd on November 19, 1868, in St. Paul, Minnesota. She was 47 years-old when she played Grace Darling's Mother, Mrs. D. G. Darling. Wright was a well-known Universal character actress who appeared mostly in silent films between 1915 and 1930. She spent most of her career under contract at Universal. Wright would later appear with Emory Johnson in the Universal production of The Morals of Hilda released on December 11, 1916.

==== Director ====
William Worthington (1872 - 1941) was born on April 8, 1872, in Troy, New York. He was 44 years of age when he directed this film. Worthington started his career as an opera singer and stage actor, then began acting in movies in 1913. He directed his first short film in 1915. Before directing this feature, most of his directorial experience was directing short films. He continued to direct films until 1925. Worthington continued to act until his death in 1941.

==== Screenplay ====
F. McGrew Willis (1891–1957) and Walter Woods (1881–1942) were scenarists. Their business advertisements in trade journals would advertise themselves as "Willis - Woods Photoplaywrights," adding to the copy "Collaborating for Better Results." Thus, when they jointly wrote a Screenplay, they would use the pseudonym Willis Woods. The copyright for this film reads, "Credits: Willis Woods." After the completion of this project; the team went on to write a script for The Devil's Bondwoman released by Universal on November 20, 1916. Both were contract members of the Universal cadre of screenwriters.

F. McGrew Willis was born Frank McGrew Willis in Pleasanton, Iowa, on August 18, 1891. He was 25 years old when he worked on this project. In 1914, after a brief stage career with various traveling companies, he became a freelance screenwriter focusing on scenarios for short films. His first screen credit for a feature film came after writing the scenario for "The Quest" in 1915.

Walter Woods was born in Pennsylvania on January 14, 1881. He was 35 years old when he worked on this script. Woods started as a leading man in several stock and road productions, eventually becoming a manager and director of stock productions. After he joined Universal, one of Woods's most significant projects was writing 20 two-reel episodes for the serial movie Graft. He wrote scripts for 76 films between 1915 and 1938.

=== Filming ===
The November 11, 1916, article The Moving Picture Weekly stated that Franklyn Farnum played a dual role and appeared in 340 of the 350 scenes in the movie "A Stranger From Somewhere."

==== Working title ====
When films enter production, they need the means to reference the project. A Working title is assigned to the project. A Working Title can also be named an Alternate title. In many cases, a working title will become the release title.
Working titles are used primarily for two reasons:

- An official title for the project has not been determined
- A non-descript title to mask the real reason for making the movie.

The working title for this film was - In Love.

=== Post production ===
Post-production is a crucial step in filmmaking, transforming the raw footage into the finished product. It requires skilled professionals working together to create a film that meets the director's vision and engages audiences.

The movie theater release of this film consisted of five reels or roughly five thousand feet of film. The average time per reel is between ten and fifteen minutes. As a result, they estimated the movie would be between 50 and 75 minutes.

==== Studios ====
Universal produced and distributed this film. The interiors were filmed in the studio complex at Universal Studios located at 100 Universal City Plaza in Universal City, California.

== Release and reception ==
=== Official release ===
This film was copyrighted to Bluebird Photoplays, Inc., on October 30, 1916. (Note: The copyright was filed with U.S. Copyright Office and entered into the record as shown: A STRANGER FROM SOMEWHERE. 1916 5 reels. Credits: Willis Woods; director, William Worthington. © Bluebird Photoplays, Inc.; 30Oct16; LP9430.) The official film release date to U.S. theaters was November 13, 1916.

=== Advertising ===
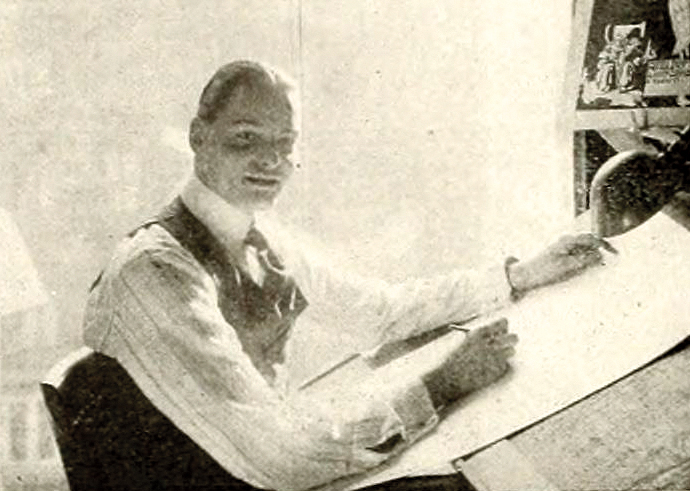
Burton Rice at work 1916

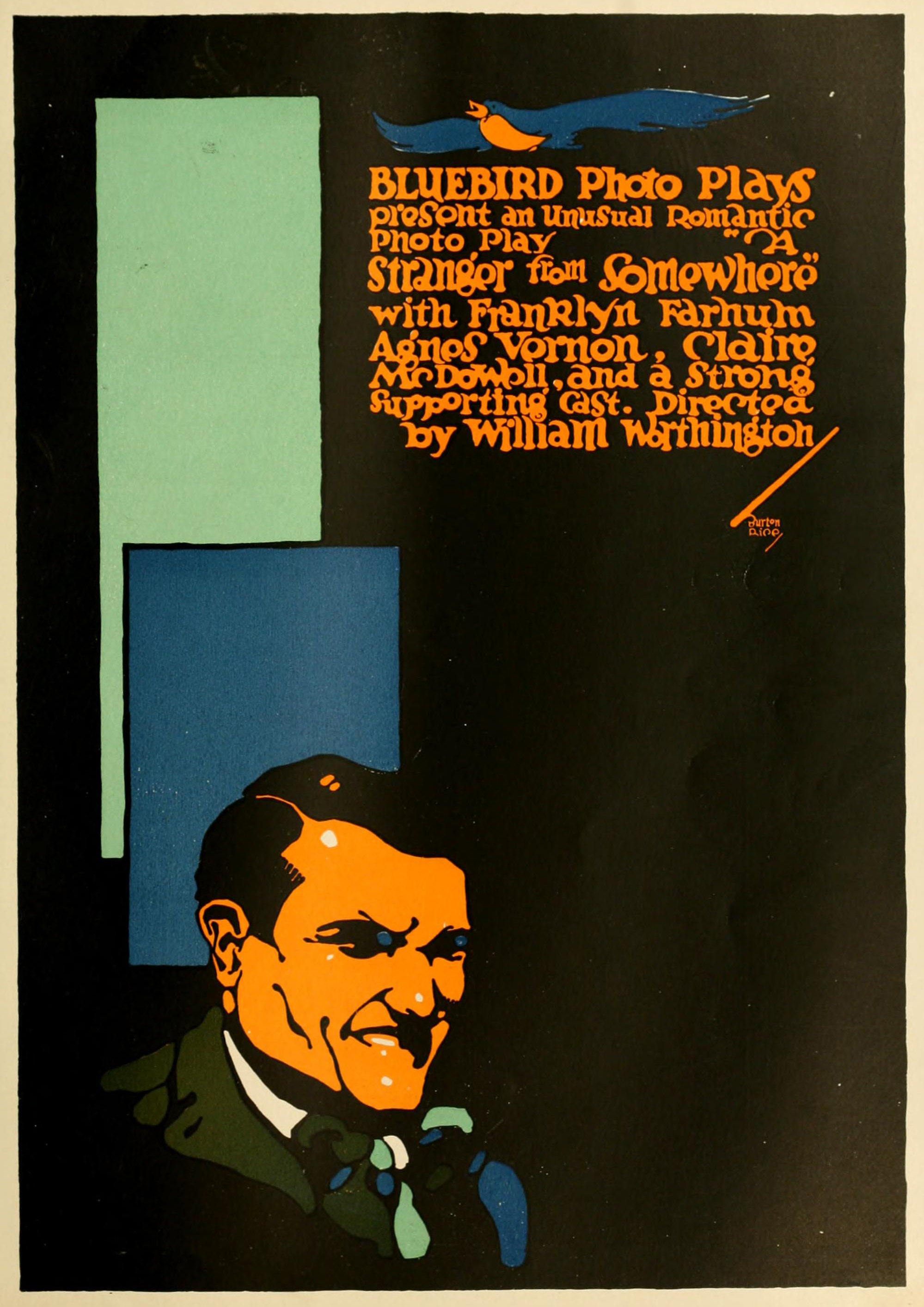
Rice poster for this movie

Advertising is essential for the success of a movie because it helps attract paying customers to the theater, resulting in higher box office revenues. A successful marketing campaign increases the hype by informing potential stakeholders about plotlines, actors, release dates, and other important information. Armed with this knowledge, a theater owner was better prepared to make a booking decision in a competitive market. In 1916, the most effective advertising for a movie was word of mouth, newspaper ads, and movie posters. In short, effective promotion tactics had to convince potential customers to visit the movie house.

Movie posters are a specific form of poster art that advertises a certain film. Advertising movies in magazines can be an effective way to appeal to a viewership and theater owners. The Bluebird Photoplay ads signaled the start of a new period of creativity in the movie ad industry. Chicago graphic artist Burton Rice joined the Universal advertising department. He was 21 years of age.

Chicago lost one of its cleverest younger artists when the advertising department of the Universal home office induced Burton Rice to take up his residence in New York and be one of its staff. Mr. Rice's work in modern art has been among the notable achievements of Chicago's commercial art circles. His poster designs especially have been the cause of much favorable comment. Although always a creative department and the home of much unique ad copy, the Universal advertising department is now turning out its best work—and it is of the kind which compels attention. In Mr. Rice, Nat G. Rothstein and Ray Cavanaugh find a most capable co-worker. — Motography - February 19, 1916, Burton Rice Now Universal Artist,

Most of Universal's 1916 bluebird advertisements featured Rice's abstract poster art, and his inserts gathered worldwide attention. His brief tenure ended in December 1916, when he set sail for Europe to become an Ambulance driver in World War I. Media related to Category:Art works by Burton Rice at Wikimedia Commons

=== Reviews ===
==== Critical response ====
Movie reviews were critical opinions for theater owners and fans. Critiques of movies printed in different trade journals were vital in determining whether to book or watch the movie. Movie critics' evaluations of this film were mixed. When critics have divergent reviews, deciding whether to see or book the movie can be challenging, especially since mixed reviews do not mean it is a bad movie. In the end, it boils down to personal choices and how much value you place in the movie review and the reviewer. Movie critics and theater owners often use the following expressions to describe the movies they are reviewing or showing.
Glossary of slang used in reviewing silent movie melodramas.

- Peter Milne reviewed the movie in the November 18, 1916 issue of the" Motion Picture News," stated:
  The direction was in charge of William Worthington who had as his principals Agnes Vernon and Franklyn Farnum. Miss Vernon is quite genuine in her role, while Mr. Farnum has two on his hands and does both nicely, drawing a distinct dividing line between them. The scenario was arranged to put out all thoughts of possible confusion regarding the stranger and the crook. And there is no double exposure either, which is a good thing.
- The reviewer in the November 16, 1916 issue of Wid's observed:
  It can be readily seen that this is about as impossible a bunch of junk as was ever offered as a scenario. It is decidedly to the credit of Mr. Farnum and Miss Vernon that the production will register as fair entertainment with the average audience, even though they refuse absolutely to consider it any way convincing. There was a sweetness and sincerity about Miss Vernon's work which made this little beauty register as decidedly pleasing. Mr. Farnum had the challenge of making two distinctive characterizations register when wearing the same clothing. Many a bad play has been saved by the personalities of the hero and heroine, and consequently, this one has a fighting chance despite its faults.
- The reviewer in the November 4, 1916 issue of Motion Picture News, announced:
  The play starts as a drama, and when everything is ready for serious business the complications run into comedy finishing with a surprise.

==== Audience response ====
Universal focused on producing and distributing films for small-town venues. Unlike major Hollywood studios, Universal owned no movie theaters and depended on the movie house proprietors renting their films from worldwide exchanges. Before leasing a film, picture house owners were concerned if the film was a potential moneymaker in their locale. Proprietors would subscribe to trade journals to assist them in making these financial judgments. Movie magazines would show the film's branding, critical reviews and publish other managers' viewpoints, including attendance numbers and revenue. Universal and owners alike depended on these movie reviews and movie house experiences. This is one of the printed experiences of a theater owner.

- Fred McCoy, Rex Theatre Gallup, New Mexico population 3,900
  Letter to Bluebird Exchange
  Gentlemen - Enclosed find a check for service, also the contracts for "Hell Morgan's Girl." I used "A Stranger from Somewhere" on Sunday, and will say it was the best picture since "Love's Lariat," and ...

== Myths ==
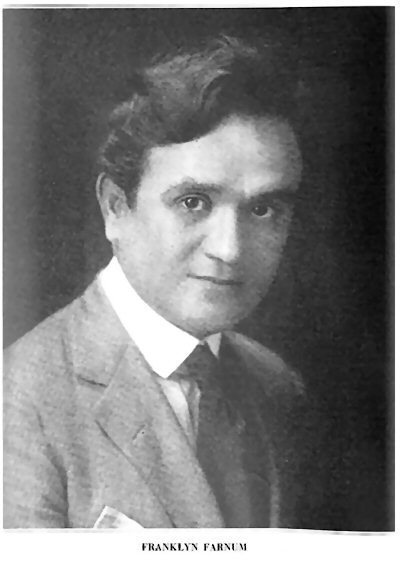
Franklyn Farnum

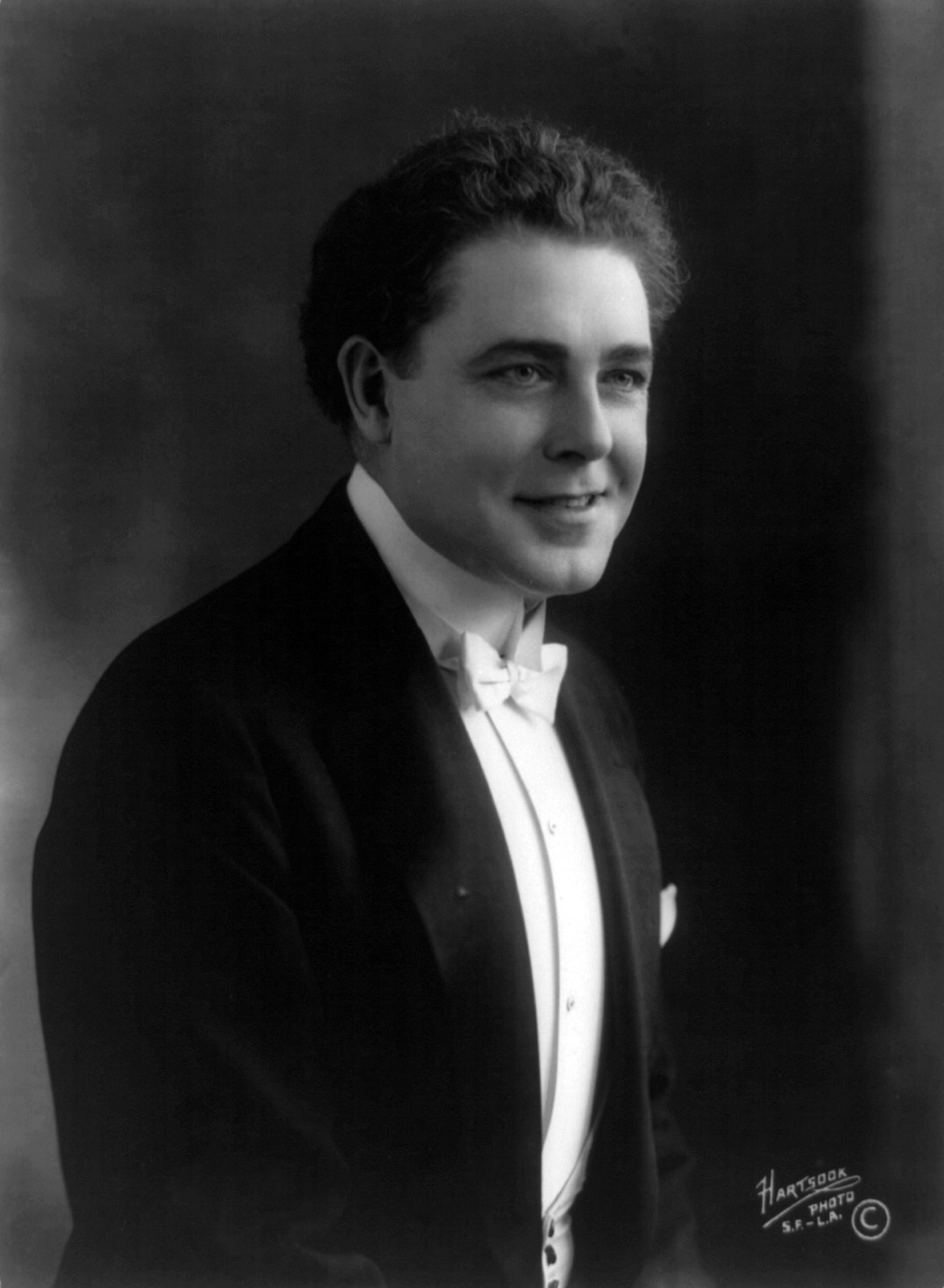
William Farnum

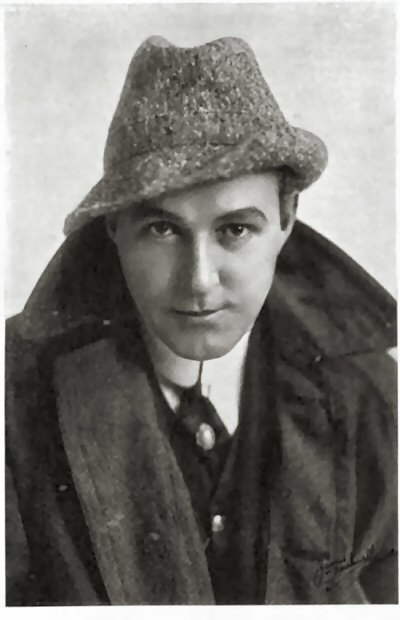
Dustin Farnum

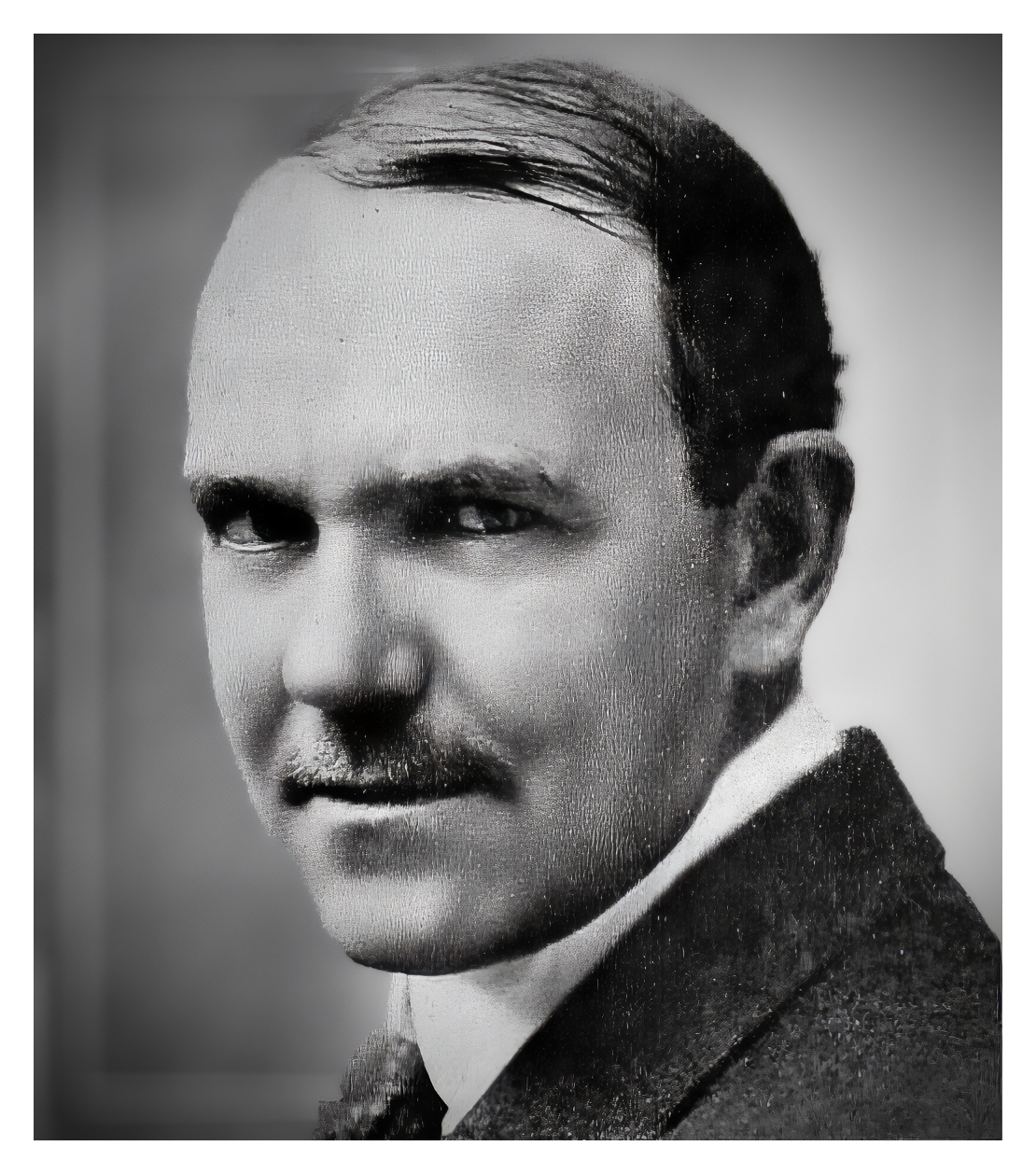
Marshall Farum

"'Franklyn Farnum" (1878–1961) was unrelated to the famous Farum family of actors. He was born "William Smith" on June 5, 1878, in Boston, Massachusetts. His father died before he was born, leaving his mother penniless. He became a vaudeville actor at the age of twelve. A Cub reporter suggested he change his name to Franklyn Farnum, cashing in on the last name of the stage and screen actors Dustin and William Farnum. He entered silent films near the age of 40. During his career as a character actor and Hollywood extra, he appeared in at least 1,100 films.

Most media coverage of this movie and actor Franklyn Farnum cites his connections to William and Dustin Farnum. They always mention him as the younger brother of the acting duo. In other words, the young reporter's suggestion worked precisely as planned.

== Preservation status ==
Many silent-era films did not survive for reasons as explained on this Wikipedia page. (Note: Film is history. With every foot of film lost, we lose a link to our culture, the world around us, each other, and ourselves. – Martin Scorsese, filmmaker, director NFPF Board A report by Library of Congress film historian and archivist David Pierce estimates that: around 75% of original silent-era films have perished; 14% of the 10,919 silent films released by major studios exist in their original 35 mm or other formats; 11% survive only in full-length foreign versions or film formats of lesser image quality.)

According to the Library of Congress American Silent Feature Film Survival Database, this film is extant. (Note: According to the posting on the American Silent Feature Film Survival Database, the following information was provided: Holdings: U.S. Archive Studio: Universal Completeness: complete Format: 35 mm: Usw Note: 35 mm Acetate Dupe Negative: Usw Record No.: 37266)

== Gallery ==
The Players and Director

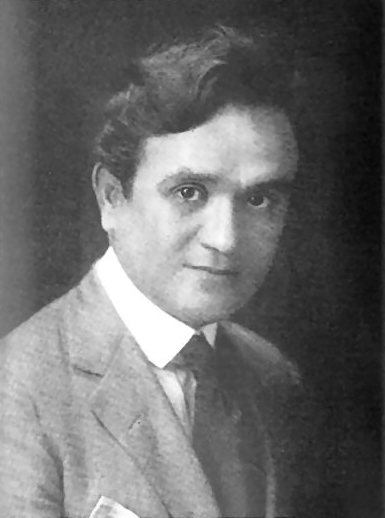
1917
Franklyn Farnum

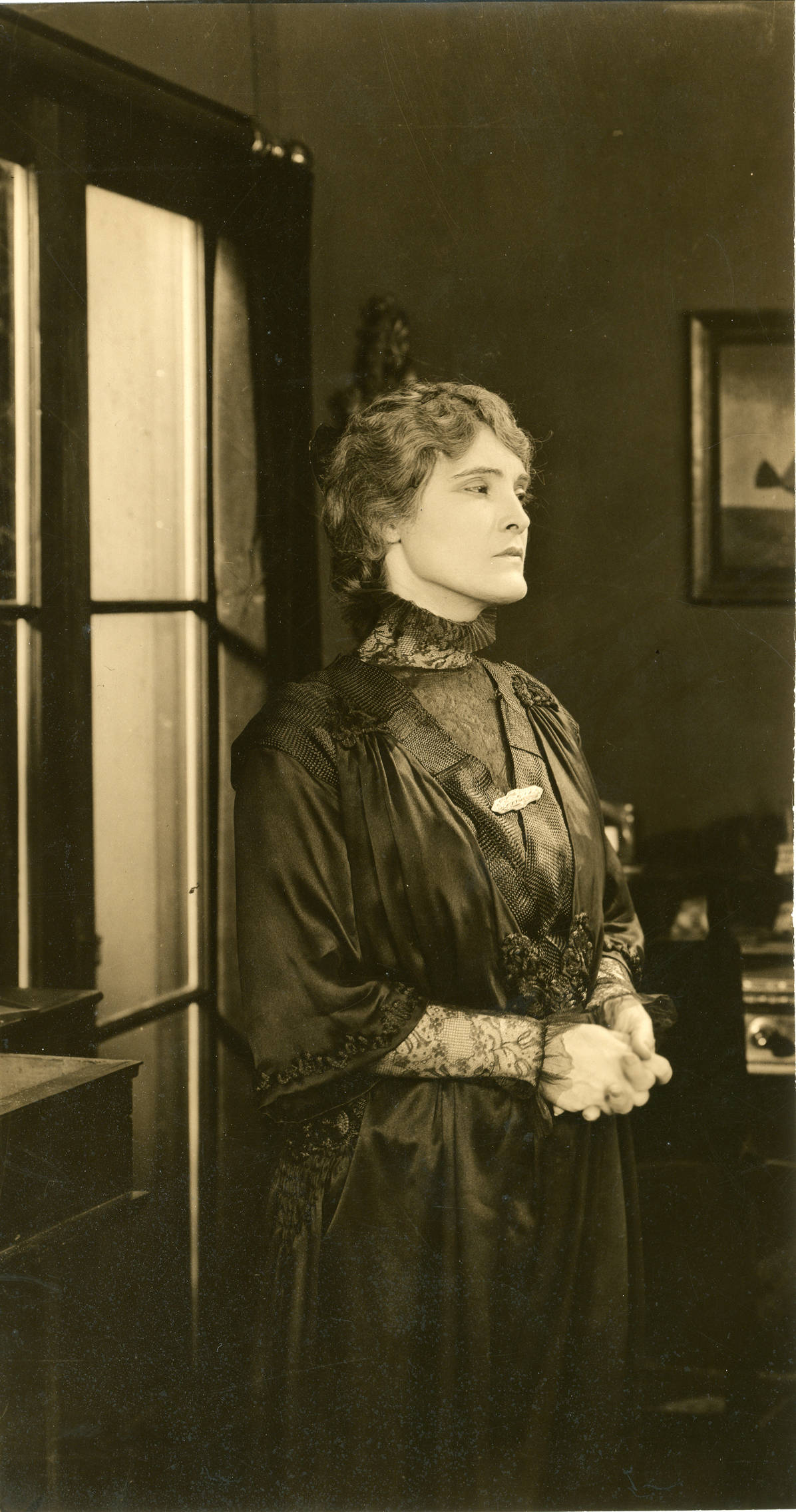
1922
Claire McDowell

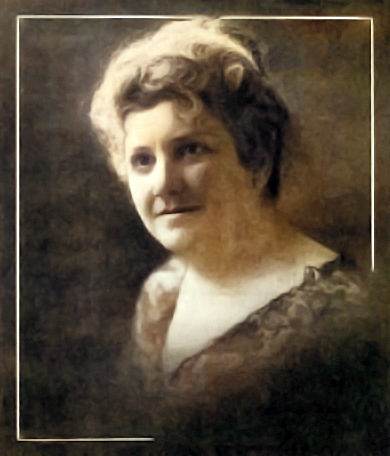
1916
Helen Wright
Movie Stills

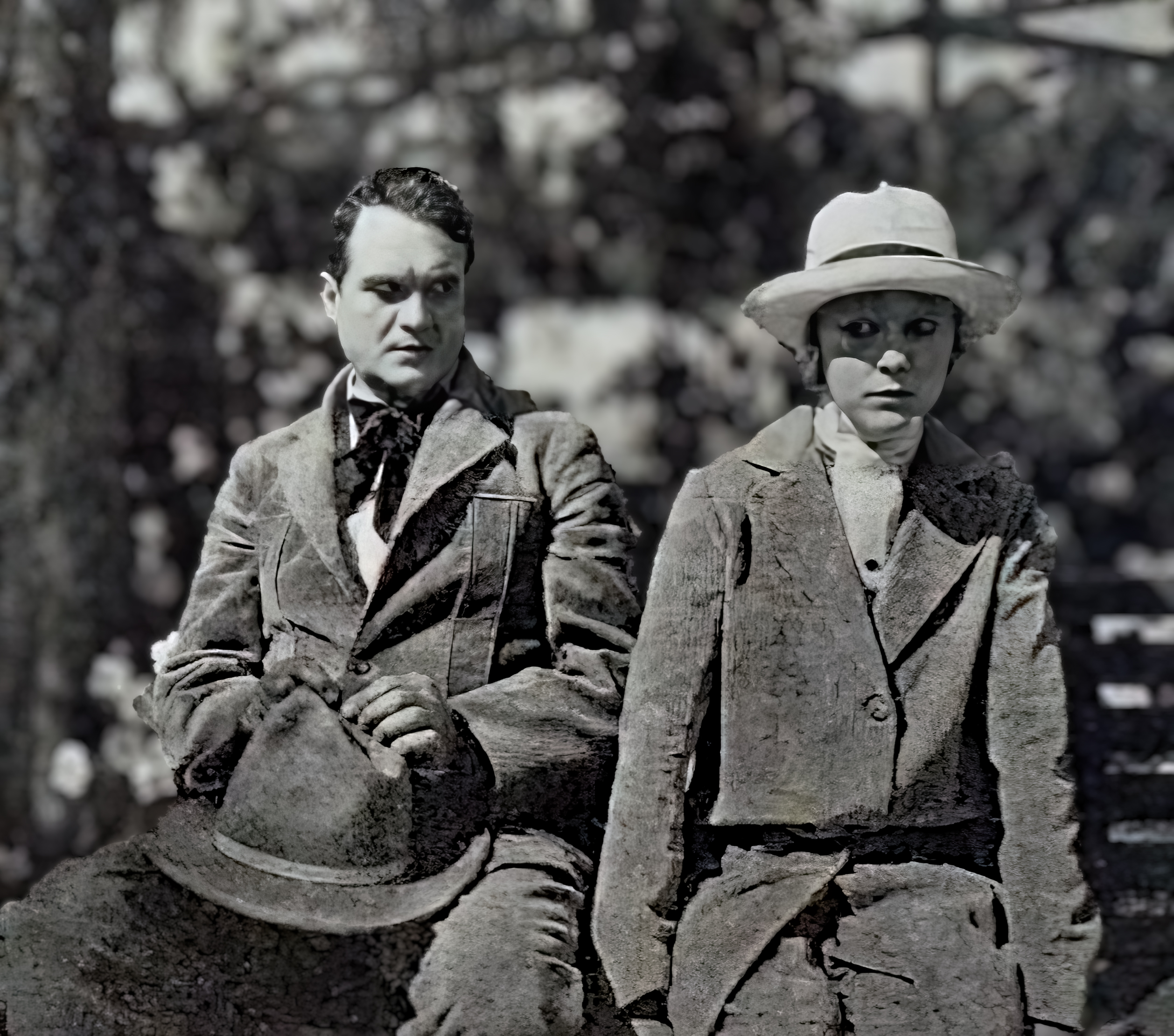
Will he propose?

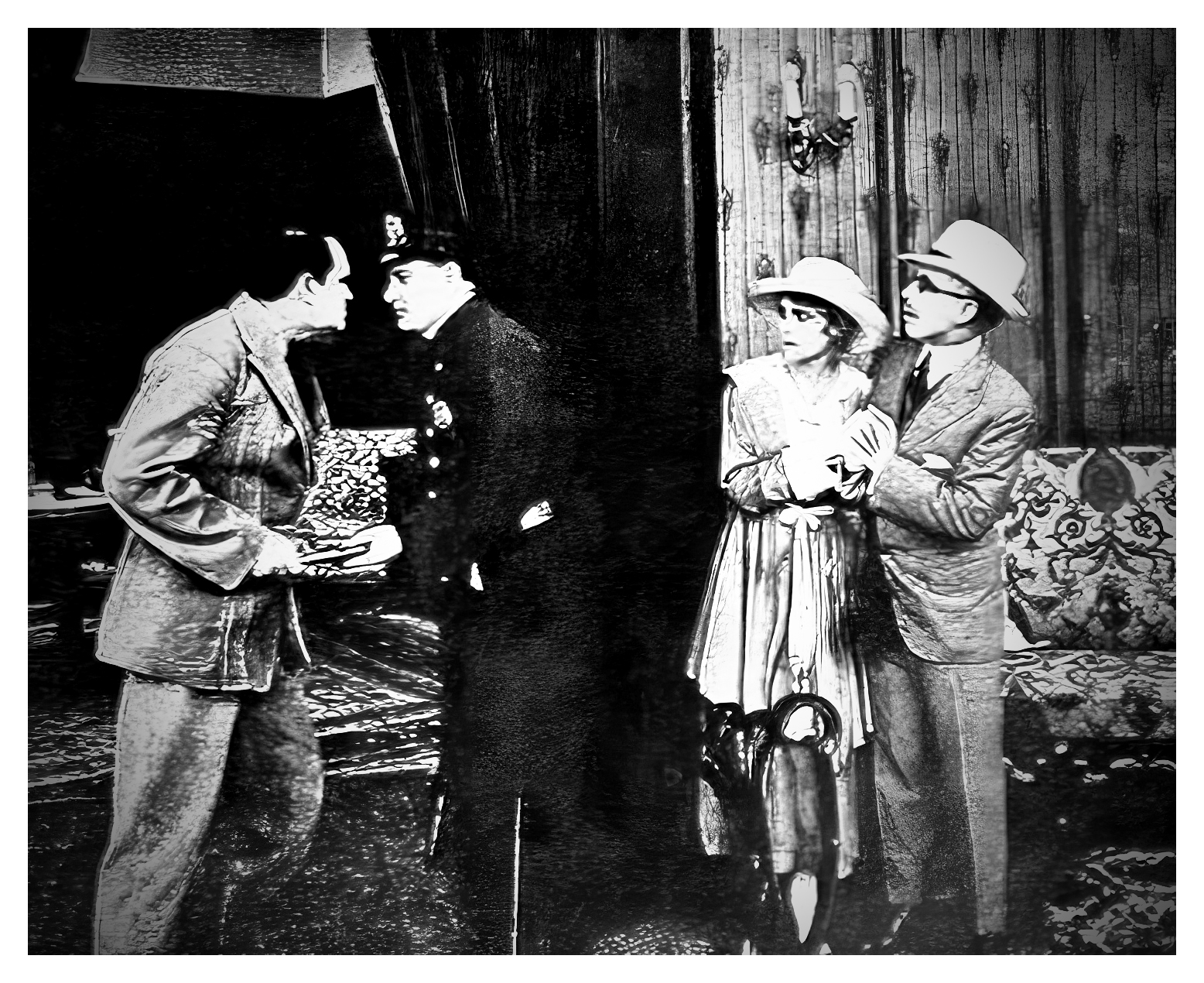
Police stop Dippy and Sam fight

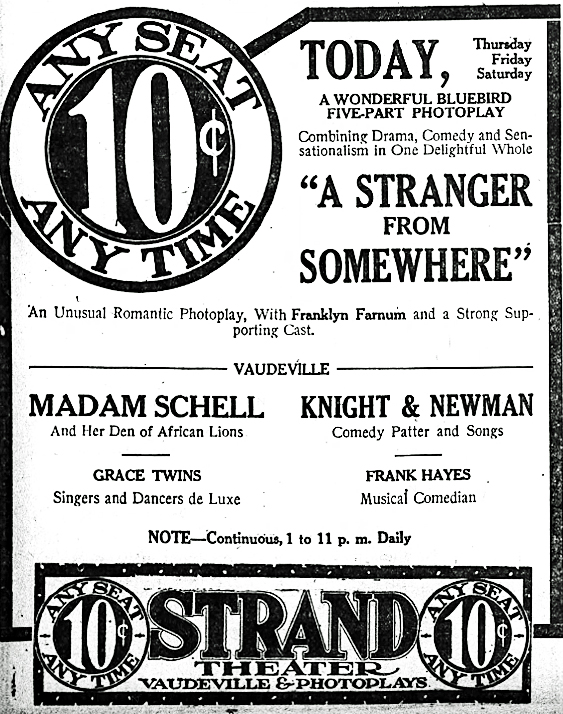
Newspaper Ad

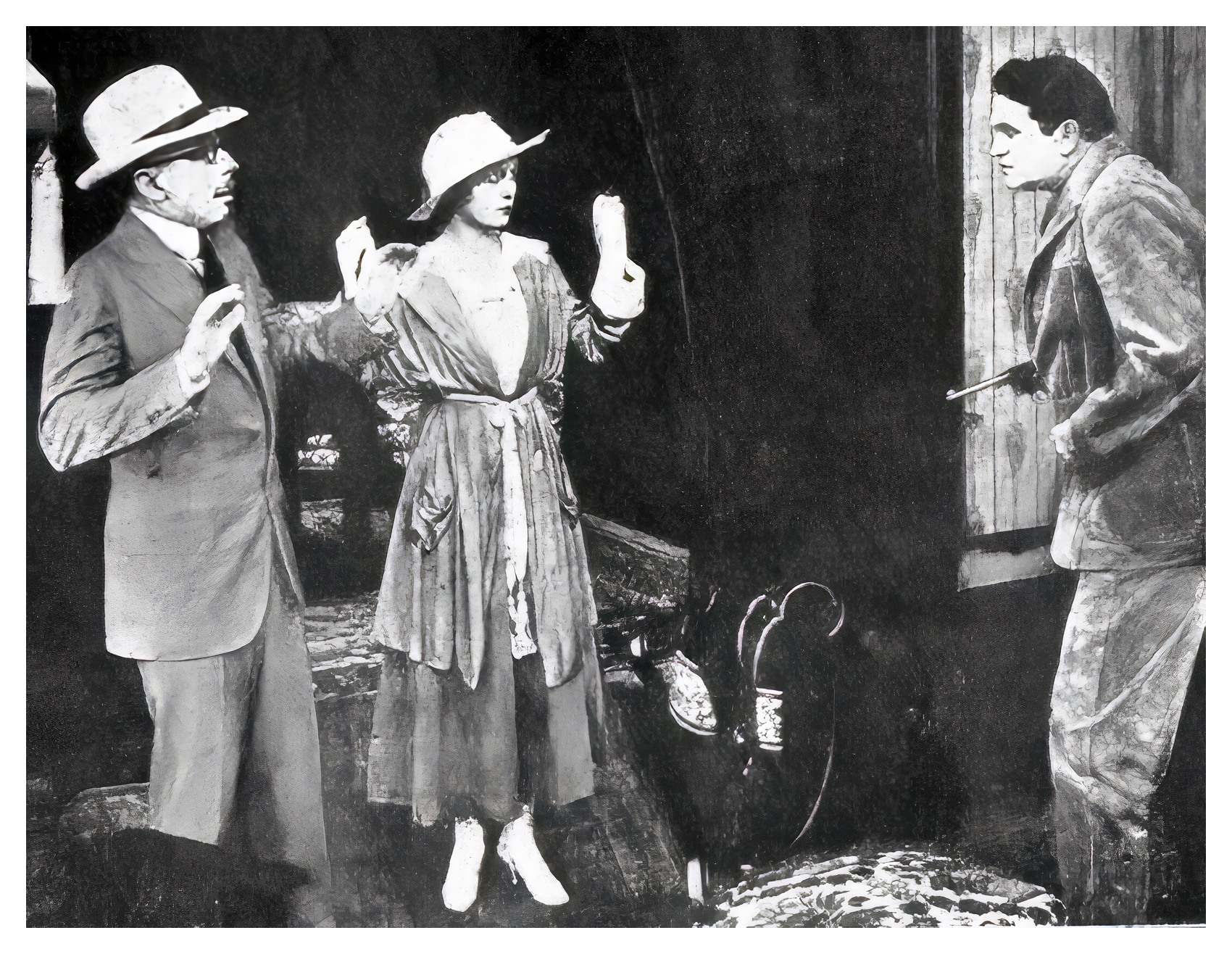

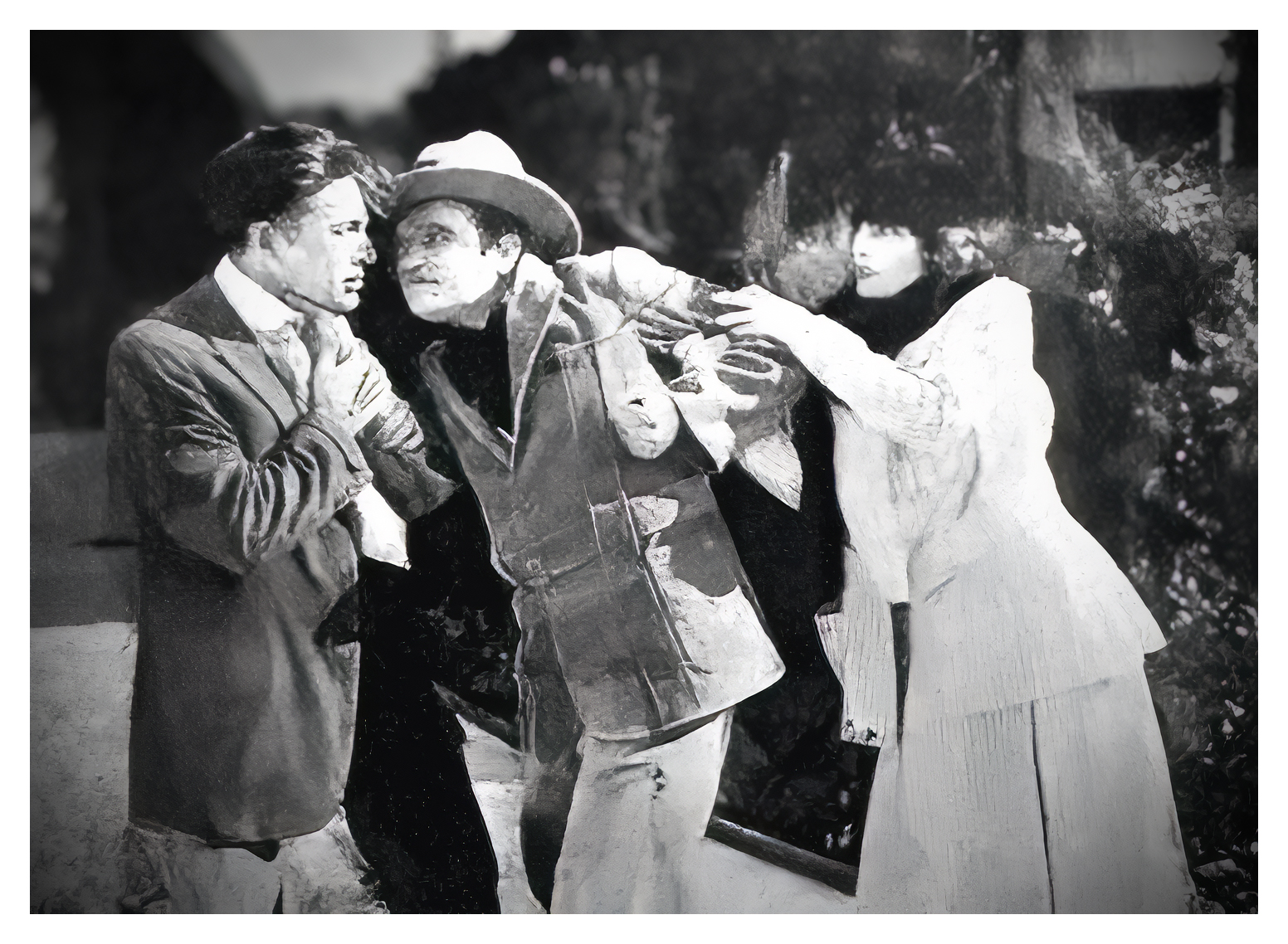

== Glossary ==
◆ This glossary lists common terms used in 1916 by the media film critics ◆
Term	Definition
Badger game	Extortion scheme in which the victim is tricked into a compromising position and then blackmailed
Black hats	Bad person, especially a villain or criminal in a movie, novel, or play
Breezy	Someone is breezy; they behave in a cheerful and confident. The movie reviewers refer to the hero of this film as a Breezy Westerner
Con artist	Person who cheats or tricks others by persuading them to believe something that is not true
Con game	Scam in which the victim is persuaded to trust the swindler in some way
Fat Roll	Amount of money that is very large
Filches	Pilfer or steal (something, especially a thing of small value) casually
Irish exit	Irish Goodbye is a vaguely ethnophobic term used for someone who leaves leaving a social gathering without saying your farewells
Michigan bankroll	Large roll of paper money in small denominations. a roll of counterfeit paper money or a roll of money-sized paper surrounded by one or more genuine bills
Paint the town red	Go out and flamboyantly enjoy yourself, movie reviewers used the phrase, to show the big city how red paint should be applied
Pickpocket	Pickpocketing involves the stealing of money or other valuables from the person or a victim's pocket without them noticing the theft
Sharpers	Swindlers, especially at cards
Swindlers	people who use deception to deprive someone of money or possessions
Yellowback	U.S. dollar having a yellow-colored back. Out West during the Civil War, California used currencies with yellowback, while out East, they used greenbacks
Westerner	Man from the old West

== Bibliography ==
- Keil, C.; Stamp, S. (2004). American Cinema's Transitional Era: Audiences, Institutions, Practices. ACLS Humanities E-Book. University of California Press. ISBN 978-0-520-24027-8.
- Hirschhorn, Clive (1983). The Universal Story (1st ed.). New York: Crown Publishers. p. 400. ISBN 0-517-55001-6. "The Complete History of the Studio and its 2,641 Films"
- Cooper, M.G. (2010). Universal Women: Filmmaking and Institutional Change in Early Hollywood. Women and film history international. University of Illinois Press. ISBN 978-0-252-03522-7.
- Kear, L.; King, J. (2009). Evelyn Brent: The Life and Films of Hollywood's Lady Crook. EBSCO ebook academic collection. McFarland, Incorporated, Publishers. ISBN 978-0-7864-5468-6.
- Kawin, Bruce F. (1987). How Movies Work. University of California Press. p. 46. ISBN 9780520076969.
- Codori, J. (2020). Film History Through Trade Journal Art, 1916-1920. McFarland, Incorporated, Publishers. ISBN 978-1-4766-3829-4.
- Katchmer, George A. (2002). A Biographical Dictionary of Silent Film Western Actors and Actresses. McFarland Publishing. p. 488. ISBN 978-0786407637.
