= The Car of Chance =

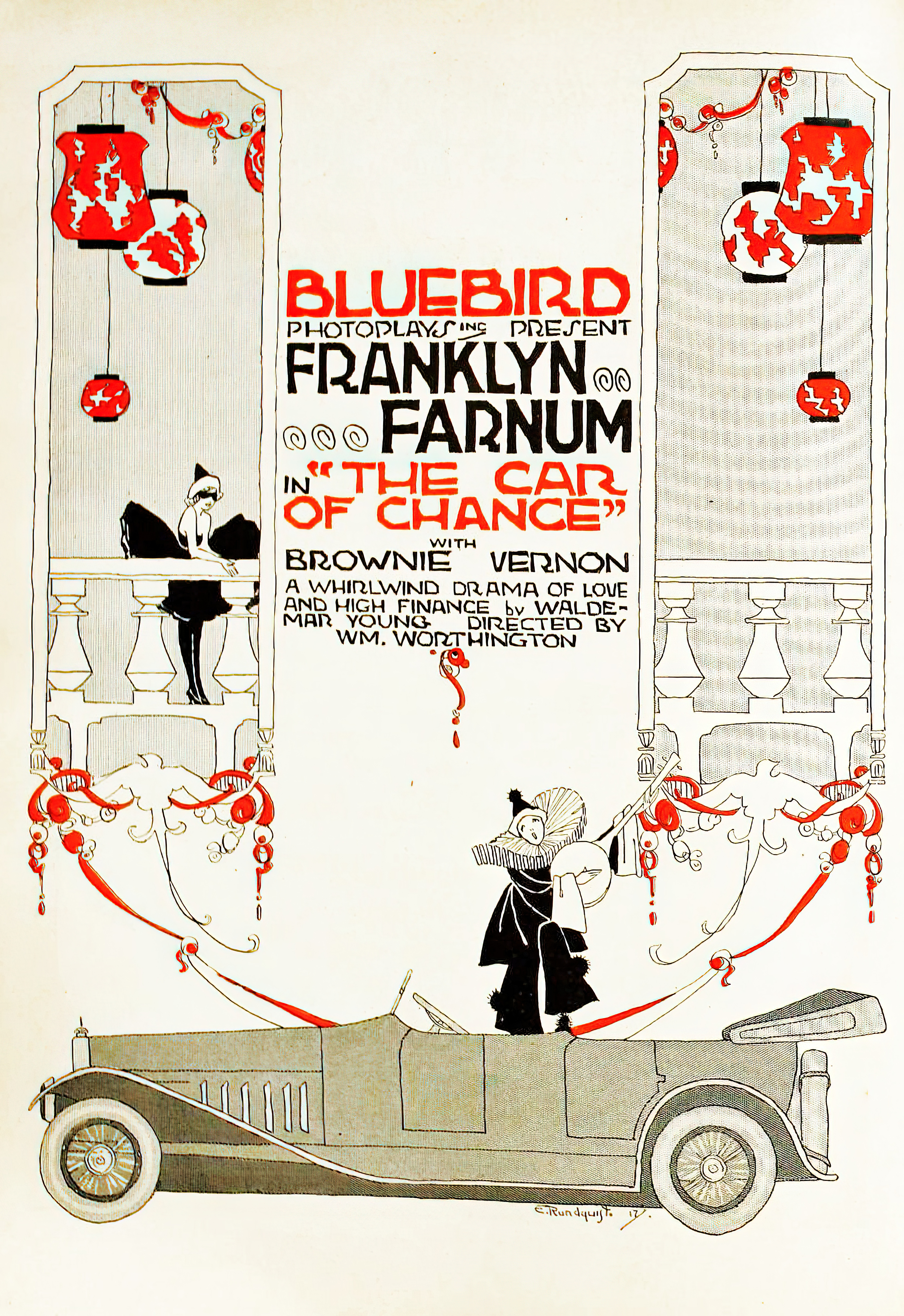
- Motion Picture News Move ad
- Directed by: William Worthington
- Written by: Eugene B. Lewis; Waldemar Young
- Starring: Franklyn Farnum; Agnes Vernon; Helen Wright
- Cinematography: Friend Baker
- Production company: Universal Pictures
- Distributed by: Universal Pictures
- Release date: July 9, 1917
- Running time: 50 minutes
- Country: United States
- Languages: Silent; English intertitles

The Car of Chance is a 1917 American silent drama film directed by William Worthington and starring Franklyn Farnum, Agnes Vernon and Helen Wright.

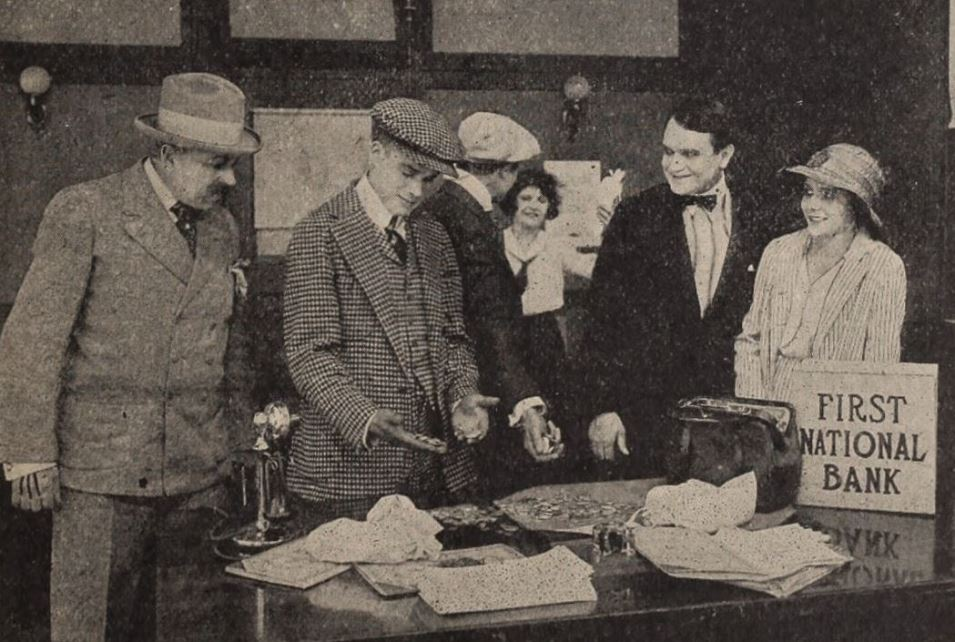

== Cast ==
- Franklyn Farnum as Arnold Baird
- Agnes Vernon as Ruth Rennett
- Helen Wright as Mrs. Bennett
- Molly Malone as Wanda Heimstone
- Mark Fenton as James Bennett
- H.J. Bennett as William Mott Smith
- Walter Belasco as Israel Heimstone
- Harry De More as Tom Nolan

== Censorship ==
Before The Car of Chance could be exhibited in Kansas, the Kansas State Board of Review required the shortening of the scene where Mott-Smith attacks Wanda in an office.

== Bibliography ==
- Robert B. Connelly. The Silents: Silent Feature Films, 1910-36, Volume 40, Issue 2. December Press, 1998.
