= Hard Punishments =

Unpublished novel by Willa Cather

Hard Punishments, also sometimes referred to as Cather's Avignon story, is the final, unpublished, and since lost novel by Willa Cather, almost entirely destroyed following her death in 1947. It is set in medieval Avignon.

== Analysis ==
Perhaps her only book entirely contained in the Old World, Hard Punishments was set in medieval Avignon. While little is known about the plot, this final novel of hers is centered on its two main protagonists, who have both been injured: André has had his tongue cut out for blasphemy, and Pierre's hands have been maimed as a result of his theft by hanging him by his thumbs. Of the surviving fragments, sin and reconciliation are major themes, and specifically, the religious redemption and conversion of André to Catholicism is a key component. For this reason, it is believed that the text was intended to be one of "cruelties" and "splendours". But even though violence and cruelty was apparently a significant part of the book, Cather withheld its description from the child protagonists and from the reader. A highly-ordered, biblically literalist state is the center of critique. Scholar John P. Anders understands Cather's preoccupation with fourteenth-century blasphemy as "appropriately allegorical and a fitting coda" to Cather's own sexual identity, which many understand to be lesbian.

The story may have been inspired by a trip she took to Avignon in 1902, or a French trip she took in 1935. Either way, the novel was written between the 1940 completion of Sapphira and the Slave Girl and the death of her brother, Roscoe Cather, in 1945. It is a continuation of her end-of-life focus on writing about landscapes outside of the Great Plains.

== Destruction and recovery ==
Following Cather's death in 1947, her lifelong partner Edith Lewis complied with her wish and destroyed almost all of the manuscript for the novel. This decision—to have Lewis destroy the manuscript, instead of Cather destroying it herself—suggests she intended to finish the novel before she died. While only one fragment was originally thought to have survived Lewis's burning, additional fragments were obtained from Cather's nephew's estate following his death in 2011. These additional fragments confirm that not only was Cather moved by French Catholicism, but that it had such a pronounced importance on her that Hard Punishments is substantially distinct from her other Catholic novels, Shadows on the Rock and Death Comes for the Archbishop.
