= The Elopement of Allen Poole =

Short story by Willa Cather

"The Elopement of Allen Poole" is a short story by Willa Cather, first published in 1893 by The Hesperian while she was a student. The story itself deals with the character of Allen Poole, who is shot by an officer on the night of his elopement with his partner, Nell.

The story is notable for being the first work in which Cather drew from her Southern heritage, and one of only two stories in which the setting is in the American South. It is relatively newly-identified; it was identified only after the publication of a collection of her short stories in 1965. While it does not bear her name in the original publication, scholars agree that it was written by Cather due to specific circumstantial evidence, including literary style and subject matter, as well as that she was the editor for The Hesperian at the time of publication. Additionally, scenes from the story are paralleled closely in Cather's later work, in particular Sapphira and the Slave Girl.

While it is unclear why she chose to leave the story unsigned, one theory is that she feared consequences from her family for impugning Southern men, such as when she writes, "It takes a man of the South to do nothing properly." It has been praised as a "local color" story, that is, centered around male characters deeply influenced by their physical and social environment. At the same time, it has been criticized as having a male-defined view, using conflicting archetypes such as the "nurturing" and "devouring" mother to advance an ambivalent view on women. It has also been questioned whether Cather's use of a male character is a way of signifying her own potential attraction to women.
