= On the Divide =

1896 short story by Willa Cather

- Short story by Willa Cather
- Country: United States
- Language: English
- Genre: Short story

Publication
- Published in: Overland Monthly
- Publication type: Magazine
- Publication date: January 1896

"On the Divide" is a short story by Willa Cather. It was first published in Overland Monthly in January 1896.

== Plot summary ==
The story centers on Canute Canuteson, a lonely, giant-like Norwegian immigrant who has lived alone in a sod hut on the Nebraska "Divide" for ten years. The isolation and the brutal environmental conditions have pushed him to the brink of madness. He drinks heavily to cope with the silence and the "insanity of the plains."

Canute becomes obsessed with Lena Yensen, the daughter of a neighboring family. Unlike the romanticized courtships in Cather's later works, this relationship is born of desperation. After Lena's father agrees to the match but Lena herself refuses, Canute takes matters into his own hands. In a climactic and unsettling scene, he essentially kidnaps Lena, carries her to his cabin, and forces a terrified preacher to marry them at gunpoint. The story ends with a strange moment of domesticity: Canute falls asleep at Lena's feet, exhausted by his own loneliness, and Lena, seeing his vulnerability, chooses to stay rather than flee.

== Characters ==
- Canute Canuteson
- Jim Peterson
- Ole Yensen
- Mary Lee Yensen, Ole's wife.
- Lena Yensen, Ole and Mary's daughter.
- Anne Hermanson
- Sorenson

== Allusions to other works ==
- Milton, Dante, The Bible, especially Eden, are mentioned.

== Literary significance and criticism ==
On the Divide was Cather's first story to be published in a national magazine. In a 1938 letter to Edward Wagenknetch, Willa Cather admitted that On the Divide was retouched by one of her professors and submitted for publication without her consent.

The story bears similarities with O Pioneers!. Moreover, it has been noted that Cather's spare style parallels the harshness of the landscape.
