= The Enchanted Bluff =

1909 short story by Willa Cather

- Short story by Willa Cather

Text available at Wikisource
- Country: United States
- Language: English
- Genre: Short story

Publication
- Published in: Harper's
- Publication type: Magazine
- Publication date: April 1909

"The Enchanted Bluff" is a short story by Willa Cather. It was first published in Harper's in April 1909.

== Plot summary ==
In Sandtown, a Midwestern town, six local boys talk about the stars and the river and places they'd like to go to. Tip mentions Enchanted Bluff, a rock surrounded by a plain in New Mexico, where Native Americans used to live before the Spaniards came along. Once, the men were down the rock hunting and an army party killed them. The women and children starved to death on the rock, as an "awful storm" or waterspout had destroyed the stairs needed to go down the rock. The boys eventually get back to their house, and later talk about their plan to go there.

Years later, none of them ever made it to the Enchanted Bluff. Percy is a stockbroker in Kansas City; Otto worked on the railway and has now taken up his father's tailor shop with his brother; Arthur had done nothing with his life. He tells the narrator he wants to go to the Enchanted Bluff and to the Grand Canyon, but soon dies in the same old town. Tip, however, plans to go there when his son, who is also obsessed with the bluff, is old enough to go with him.

== Characters ==
- The narrator, a boy at the outset of the story.
- Fritz Hasler, 11 years old at the outset of the story.
- Otto Hasler, 12 years old at the outset of the story. He is said to be good at mathematics.
- Mr Hasler, the German tailor.
- Percy Pound, a fat boy. He likes to read detective novels.
- Tip Smith, a redhaired boy
- Mr Smith, the grocer.
- Arthur Adams, 17 years old at the outset of the story.
- The gambler's sons, friends of Arthur's.
- Spanish Fanny's boy, a friend of Arthur's.
- Uncle Bill, Tip's uncle. He is a wanderer, who once came upon Enchanted Bluff.
- Bert, Tip's son.

== Allusions to other works ==
- The Bible is mentioned, with direct references to the Holy Land, Jordan, the Dead Sea, and the Mount of Olives.

== Allusions to actual history ==
- Napoleon Bonaparte, Francisco Vásquez de Coronado, the Pilgrim Fathers, and the Mormons are mentioned in the history of Sandtown.

== Literary significance and criticism ==
It has been noted that The Enchanted Bluff reappears in The Professor's House, when the protagonist of the novel comes upon the Blue Mesa.
