= Five Stories =

Five Stories may refer to:

- Five Stories (short story collection), a 1956 collection of stories by Willa Cather
- 5 Stories (EP), a 2004 EP by Manchester Orchestra
- Five Stories (album), a 2001 album by Kris Delmhorst
