= The Best Years (story) =

1948 short story by Willa Cather

- Short story by Willa Cather
- Country: United States
- Language: English
- Genre: Short story

Publication
- Published in: The Old Beauty and Others
- Publication type: Short story collection
- Publication date: 1948

"The Best Years" is a short story by Willa Cather, first published after her death in the collection The Old Beauty and Others in 1948. It is her final work, and was intended as a gift to her brother, Roscoe Cather, who died as it was being written. Set in Nebraska and the northeastern United States, the story takes place over twenty years, tracing the response of Lesley Ferguesson's family to her death in a snowstorm.

The short story carries images or "keepsakes" from each of her twelve published novels and the stories in Obscure Destinies. In keeping with her own literary tradition, the story has been described as being steeped in a "sense of place", where "land and physical realities" work alongside (both influencing and being influenced by) the characters and their emotions. It also deals with what Cather described as the "accords and antipathies" of family relationships, including those between generations, and the feelings of loss that accompany these relationships. It has been described as her "final achievement" in pursuing the mystery genre, and as "a rich portrait" by scholar Ann Romines. It has been said to be "richer in domestic feeling than anything else she ever wrote", but it has also been completely ignored by some scholars, or seen as "a slackening into self-indulgence", "minor", "bad" or centered on "sentimental" "self-pity".

The story draws heavily on Cather's own life, and is among her most autobiographical of stories. Her friend and teacher, Evangeline "Eva" King, is the model for the character Evangeline Knightly. According to Cather, after she moved with her family to Red Cloud, Nebraska, King, as a principal of the high school, was "the first person who interviewed the new county pupil" and "was the first person whom I ever cared a great deal for outside of my own family." It has also been suggested that her brother, James Cather, served as a model for the character of Bryan Ferguesson; similarly, her brother John "Jack" Cather may be the basis for Vincent Ferguesson, and Roscoe Cather is Hector. Her own childhood home—in particular, the attic—is also depicted in the story, chiefly as small and overcrowded.

While much of Cather's writing has been described as male-centered, "The Best Years" continues her end-of-life tradition of exploring mother-daughter relationships through the lens of women, rather than men, with careful use of a female protagonist.
