= Gayheart =

Gayheart is a surname. Notable people with the surname include:

- Rebecca Gayheart (born 1971), American television and film actress
- Carmen Gayheart (1970–1994), American murder victim

== See also ==
- Lucy Gayheart, a 1935 novel by Willa Cather
