= Five Stories (short story collection) =

1956 short story collection by Willa Cather

- 1956 p/b edition
- Author: Willa Cather
- Language: English
- Genre: (historical fiction)
- Publisher: Vintage Books
- Publication date: 1956
- Publication place: United States
- Pages: 214

Five Stories is a collection of stories, published in 1956 by the Estate of Willa Cather, after the author's death. Several of these stories had been previously published in other collections.

== Contents ==
This collection contains the following stories:

- "The Enchanted Bluff"
- "Tom Outland's Story"
- "Neighbour Rosicky"
- "The Best Years"
- "Paul's Case"
- Unfinished Avignon Story: An Article by George N. Kates
