= Lucy Gayheart =

Novel by Willa Cather

- First edition
- Author: Willa Cather
- Language: English
- Publisher: Alfred A. Knopf
- Publication date: 1935
- Publication place: United States
- Media type: Print (hardback & paperback)

Lucy Gayheart is Willa Cather's eleventh novel. It was published in 1935. The novel revolves round the eponymous character, Lucy Gayheart, a young girl from the fictional town of Haverford, Nebraska, located near the Platte River.

== History ==
Some sources indicate that Cather began writing Lucy Gayheart in 1933. Scholar Melissa Homestead argues instead that she truly began writing in the summer of 1932. Some sources agree with her. Others are imprecise or ambiguous. It appears that Cather began speaking about the story Blue Eyes on the Platte, her initial and intended name for Lucy Gayheart, as early as the 1890s (using the name Gayhardt instead of Gayheart, based on a woman she met at a party), and may have begun writing as early as 1926. While she intended to name the novel Blue Eyes on the Platte early on, she changed the title and made Lucy's eyes brown. However, scholar Janis P. Stout suggests mention of Blue Eyes on the Platte may have been facetious, only beginning to write and think about Lucy Gayheart in 1933. This is contradicted by Cather's lifelong partner and editor, Edith Lewis, insisting that not only did she begin working on Blue Eyes on the Platte "several years before" 1933, but that it was the precursor to Lucy Gayheart. Regardless of which of these details are true, it is known that Cather reused images from her 1911 short story, "The Joy of Nelly Deane", in Lucy Gayheart. "The Joy of Nelly Deane" may be best understood as an earlier version of Lucy Gayheart altogether.

== Plot summary ==
=== Book I: Lucy Gayheart ===
On Christmas holiday away from her piano studies in Chicago, Lucy Gayheart is ice skating in her hometown of Haverford, Nebraska. Harry Gordon, the most eligible bachelor in town, joins her. Later she takes the train back to Chicago - he is with her until the Omaha stop. In a prolepsis, she recalls going to a performance by Clement Sebastian and later to an audition with him - she has one scheduled for her return. Back in Chicago then, she goes to a concert by the same artist. The next day she goes to his place for a singing practice, and meets his valet Giuseppe. She will replace Sebastian's accompanist, James Mockford, whilst the latter is convalescent. During these practice sessions, Clement Sebastian seems distant. Once he gets a call asking for money, which must be from his wife. On another occasion, he goes to Madame Renee de Vignon's funeral; later he goes into that same Catholic church again. Sebastian goes off to Minnesota and Wisconsin on a tour with Mockford. Lucy feels dejected. However, she gets a telegram from Sebastian telling her to come to his studio the following day - this cheers her up. However, when she returns to his studio, she asks him if he ever got pleasure out of being in love. He says, "N-n-no, not much," then asks her "Why? -- Do you?" She replies, "Yes, I do. And nobody can spoil it." This embarrasses her—she worried that it exposed her love for him and she leaves abruptly. He manages to meet her again at Auerbach's (the studio where she studies and also gives lessons) and calms her fears. Later, both Lucy and Sebastian are depressed; the latter takes her to dinner and tells her about Larry MacGowan, a friend from his school days who died recently. The next day he tells her he loves her but is old enough to be her father so will not act on his love. He says that she is not really in love with him, only growing up and "finding things". Later, when Sebastian is off on an Eastern U.S. tour, Harry visits her and they go to operas and museums together. Although she seems appreciative and making an effort to be nice, she finds his visit stressful. She rejects his proposal for marriage, saying that she loves someone else.

Sebastian finally comes back briefly; Lucy is to go to New York City to be his accompanist in the winter, after he tours Europe. Meanwhile, she has to rehearse, and she will take up Sebastian's apartment as her studio. On his departure she cries. Later she receives a letter from her sister Pauline saying Harry has married Miss Arkwright. Professor Auerbach asks Lucy what she wants to do in her future—accompany other singers or marry Harry (whom he briefly met). He implies that it is difficult for a female accompanist -- "For the platform they always have a man."—thus, a female accompanist would only be for rehearsals. This discourages Lucy. In September, Professor Auerbach reads in the newspaper that Sebastian and Mockford drowned in Lake Como, near Cadenabbia.

=== Book II ===
Lucy returns to Haverford. No one knows why she has returned and there is some gossip about it with some saying that Professor Auerbach had fired her. Harry is very glib with Lucy whenever he meets her. She feels depressed, and her only solace is to sit in the orchard. When her sister Pauline wants to remove it to make more money growing onions and potatoes, she throws a tantrum, Pauline gives in, and it is not cut down. Later she visits Mrs. Alec Ramsay, an elderly lady and old friend, who has been asking after her and plays the piano there. At night she sometimes has nightmares. She then goes into the bank in another attempt to talk to Harry, but again he sends her away glibly. Mr. Gayheart has bought tickets for the opera. The performance seems humdrum to Lucy, but she is very impressed with the soprano's performance. The soprano had obviously seen better days and a better opera company than her present traveling opera company, but yet she gave a wonderful performance. "The wandering singer had struck something in her that went on vibrating; something that was like a purpose forming, and she could not stop it." The day before Christmas, the thought comes to her -- "What if -- what if Life itself were the sweetheart? It was like a lover waiting for her in distant cities -- across the sea; drawing her, enticing her, weaving a spell over her." This cheers her up and the next day, she writes to Professor Auerbach and inquires about returning to her job with him in Chicago again. He replies that she can come in March, when her replacement, the current teacher, leaves. Meanwhile, Pauline has heard that Lucy may have had a love affair with a singer who died. In late January, Pauline announces that she has two piano students for Lucy. Lucy refuses to teach them. In the ensuing argument, Pauline indicates that their father has made financial sacrifices and gone into debt to finance Lucy's musical education in Chicago. She also indicates that she has heard talk about Lucy and Sebastian and that the gossip is that Harry threw Lucy over when he found out about the two. After this, Lucy leaves the house carrying her skates. She finds it hard going due to a recent snowfall and decides to catch a ride with whoever passes so that she can return. However, Harry is the person who appears. When she asks for a ride, he pretends he is too busy to take her back to her house and drives past her. She reaches the area that she and her friends had always used for skating. However, the river has changed its course since she last skated there and the shallow part that froze solid is no longer there. Lucy is so angry at Harry for driving past her that she does not notice any change in the river. When she skates toward the center, the ice cracks and she falls through. One of her skates catches on a submerged branch of a tree that had fallen in during the spring flood last year. Her body is found by her father and other locals.

=== Book III ===
This book is written from Harry Gordon's point of view and includes his reflections. Twenty-five years later, in 1927, Mr. Gayheart is brought back from Chicago, where he died in a hospital. Pauline had died five years earlier, so he was the sole remaining member of the family. Many people turn up at the funeral. Harry had become chummy with Mr Gayheart after Pauline's death and they would often play chess together. It is revealed in Harry's thoughts that he had regretted his hasty marriage and that it had been in retaliation for Lucy's rejection. When she returned to Haverford, he realized that he still loved her, but still wanted to punish her for rejecting him so he avoided her and tried to distance himself from her, even though he knew she wanted contact. "He knew that if he were alone with her for a moment and she held out her hands to him with that look [of pleading], he couldn't punish her any more -- and she deserved to be punished." He blamed himself for her death. Harry had given Mr. Gayheart a mortgage with the Gayheart farm as surety in the last years of Mr. Gayheart's life. Mr. Gayheart had been unable to repay the mortgage, so Harry now owned the farm. He ponders on the footprints made by Lucy at 13 in a concrete sidewalk when it was newly laid. He tells his bank assistant Milton Chase that he can have the farmhouse to live in, provided that Chase makes sure that nothing happens to the footprints. He says that Chase will inherit the farm when he dies.
