= O Pioneers! =

1913 novel by Willa Cather

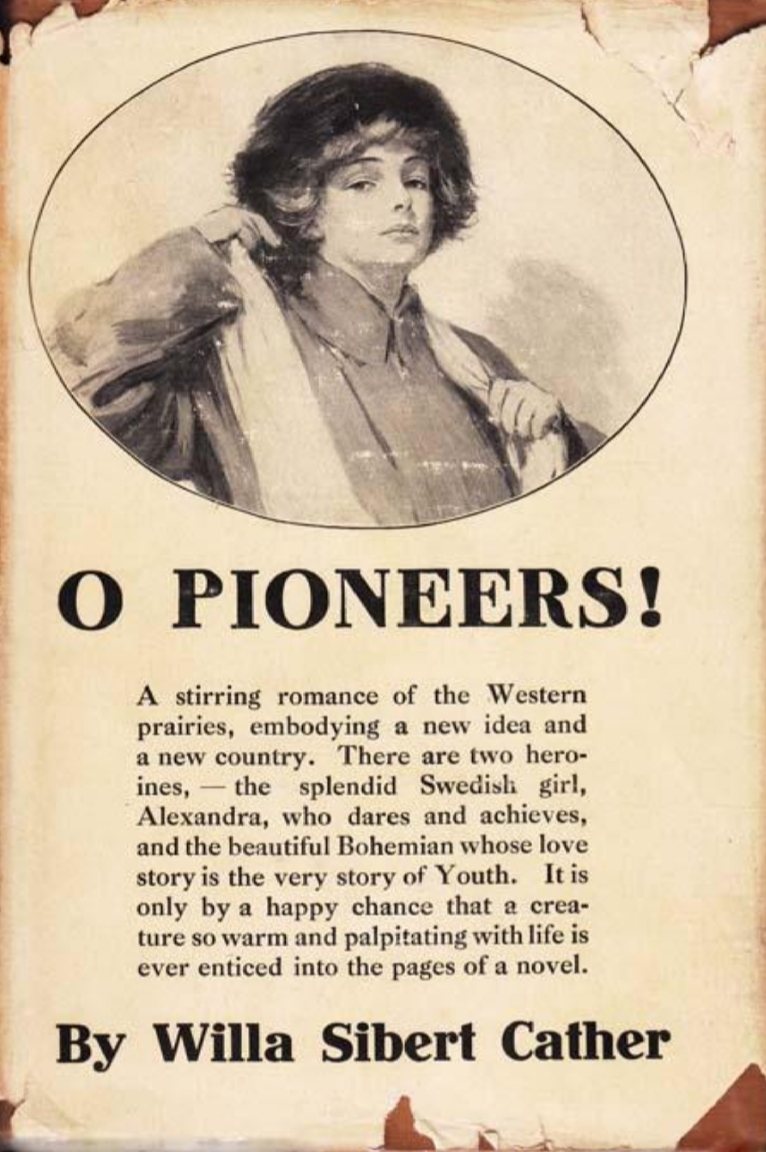
- First edition
- Author: Willa Cather
- Language: English
- Genre: Historical fiction
- Publication date: 1913
- Publication place: United States
- Media type: Print (hardback & paperback)
- Preceded by: Alexander's Bridge
- Followed by: The Song of the Lark
- Text: O Pioneers! at Wikisource

O Pioneers! is a 1913 novel by American author Willa Cather, written while she was living in New York. It was her second published novel. The title is a reference to a poem by Walt Whitman entitled "Pioneers! O Pioneers!" from Leaves of Grass (1855).

== Plot introduction ==
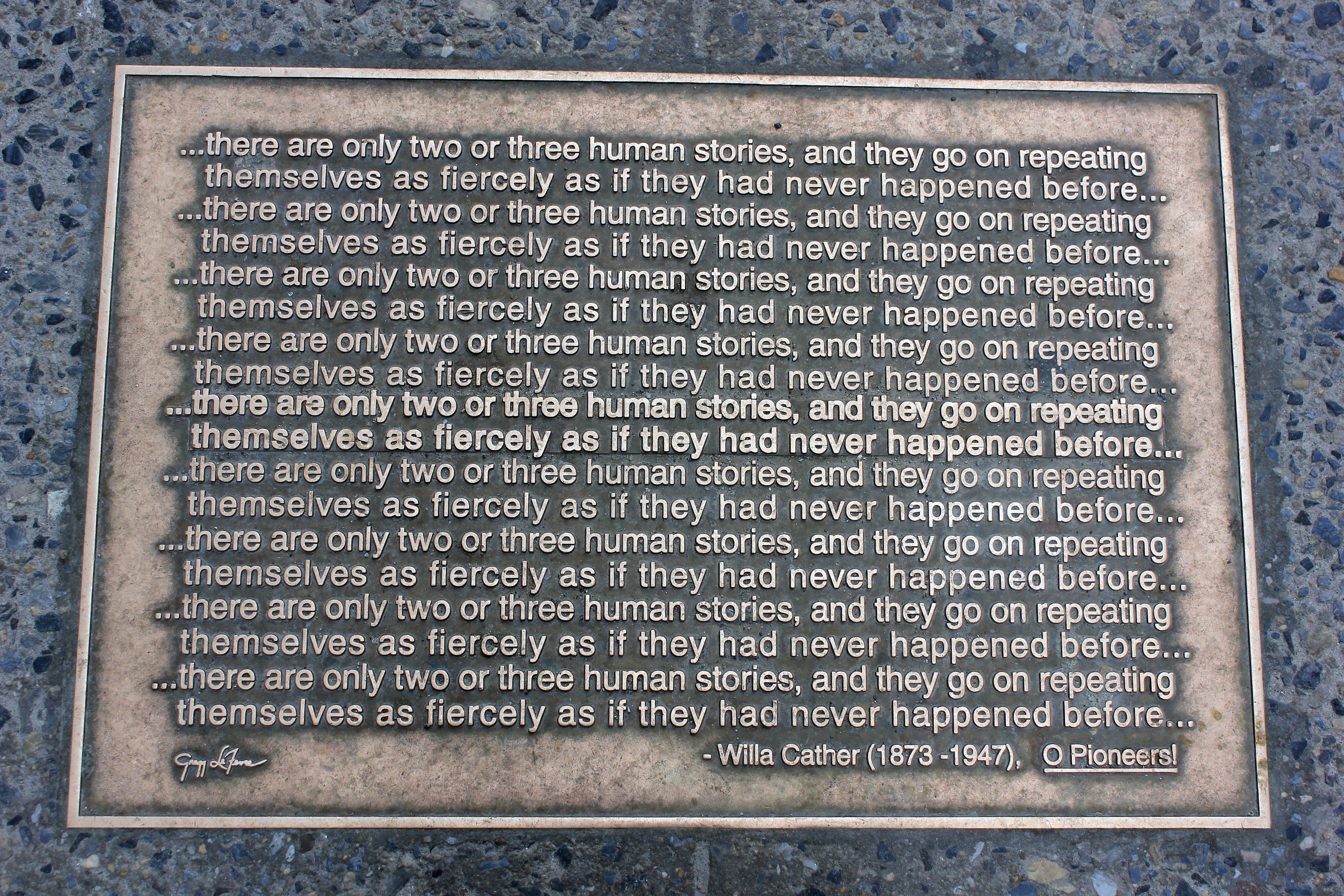
"There are only two or three human stories, and they go on repeating ..."

O Pioneers! tells the story of the Bergsons, a family of Swedish-American immigrants in the farm country near the fictional town of Hanover, Nebraska, at the turn of the 20th century. The main character, Alexandra Bergson, inherits the family farmland when her father dies, and she devotes her life to making the farm a viable enterprise at a time when many other immigrant families are giving up and leaving the prairie. The novel is also concerned with two romantic relationships, one between Alexandra and family friend Carl Linstrum and the other between Alexandra's brother Emil and the married Marie Shabata.

== Synopsis ==
The book is divided into five parts, each of which has numerous chapters.

=== Part I – The Wild Land ===
On a windy January day in Hanover, Nebraska, Alexandra Bergson is with her five-year-old brother Emil, whose little kitten has climbed a telegraph pole and is afraid to come down. Alexandra asks her neighbor and friend Carl Linstrum to retrieve the kitten. Later, Alexandra finds Emil in the general store with Marie Tovesky. They are playing with the kitten. Marie lives in Omaha and is visiting her uncle Joe Tovesky.

Alexandra's father is dying, and it is his wish that she run the farm after he is gone. Alexandra and her brothers Oscar and Lou later visit Ivar, known as Crazy Ivar because of his unorthodox views. For instance, he sleeps in a hammock, believes in killing no living thing and goes barefoot summer and winter. But he is known for healing sick animals. Alexandra is concerned about their hogs as the hogs of many of their neighbors are dying. Crazy Ivar advises her to keep their hogs clean rather than letting them live in filth and to give them fresh, clean water and good food. This simply confirms Oscar's and Lou's opinion that Ivar deserves the name Crazy Ivar. Alexandra, however, starts making plans for where she will relocate the hogs.

After years of crop failure, many of the Bergson's neighbors are selling out, even if it means taking a loss. Then they learn the Linstrums have also decided to leave. Oscar and Lou want to leave too, but neither their mother nor Alexandra will. After visiting villages downwards to see how they are getting on, Alexandra talks her brothers into mortgaging the farm to buy more land, in hopes of ending up as rich landowners.

=== Part II – Neighboring Fields ===
Sixteen years later, the farms are now prosperous. Alexandra and her brothers have divided up their inheritance, and Emil has just returned from college. The Linstrum farm has failed, and Marie, now married to Frank Shabata, has bought it. That same day, the Bergsons are surprised by a visit from Carl Linstrum, whom they have not seen for thirteen years. [Note: Carl says it has been sixteen years, but this is a textual error. John Bergson died sixteen years earlier, and Carl's family left during the drought that occurred three years later.] Having failed at a job in Chicago, he is on his way to Alaska, but decides to stay with Alexandra for a while. Carl notices the growing flirtatious relationship between Emil and Marie. Lou and Oscar suspect that Carl wants to marry Alexandra, and are resentful at the idea that Carl might end up owning Alexandra's share of the farm, which they still view as belonging to them and which would otherwise be inherited by their children. This causes problems between Alexandra and her brothers, and they stop speaking to each other. Carl, recognizing a problem, decides to leave for Alaska. At the same time, Emil announces he is leaving to travel through Mexico. Alexandra is left alone.

=== Part III – Winter Memories ===
Winter has settled down over the Divide again; the season in which Nature recuperates, in which she sinks to sleep between the fruitfulness of autumn and the passion of spring. The birds have gone. The teeming life that goes on down in the long grass is exterminated. The prairie dog keeps his hole. The rabbits run shivering from one frozen garden patch to another and are hard put to it to find frost-bitten cabbage stalks. At night the coyotes roam the wintry waste, howling for food. The variegated fields are all one color now; the pastures, the stubble, the roads, and the sky are the same leaden gray. The hedgerows and trees are scarcely perceptible against the bare earth, whose slaty hue they have taken on. The ground is frozen so hard that it bruises the foot to walk on the roads or in the plowed fields. It is like an iron country, and the spirit is oppressed by its rigor and melancholy. One could easily believe that in that dead landscape the germs of life and fruitfulness were extinct forever. Alexandra spends the winter alone, except for occasional visits from Marie, whom she visits with Mrs. Lee, Lou's mother-in-law. She also has an increased number of mysterious dreams she has had since girlhood. These dreams are about a strong, god-like male figure who carries her over the fields.

=== Part IV – The White Mulberry Tree ===
Emil returns from Mexico City. His best friend, Amédée, is now married with a young son. At a fair at the French church, Emil and Marie kiss for the first time. They later confess their illicit love, and Emil determines to leave for law school in Michigan. Before he leaves, Amédée dies from a ruptured appendix, and as a result both Emil and Marie realize what they value most. Before leaving for Michigan, Emil stops by Marie's farm to say one last goodbye, and they fall into a passionate embrace beneath the white mulberry tree. They stay there for several hours, until Marie's husband, Frank, finds them and shoots them in a drunken rage. He flees to Omaha, where he later turns himself in for the crime. Ivar discovers Emil's abandoned horse, leading him to search for the boy and discover the bodies.

=== Part V – Alexandra ===
After Emil's death Alexandra is distraught, in shock, and slightly dazed. She goes off in a rainstorm. Ivar goes looking for her and brings her back home, where she sleeps fitfully and dreams about death. She then decides to visit Frank in Lincoln where he is incarcerated. While in town she walks by Emil's university campus, comes upon a polite young man who reminds her of Emil, and feels better. The next day she talks to Frank in prison. He is bedraggled and can barely speak properly, and she promises to do what she can to see him released; she bears no ill will toward him. She then receives a telegram from Carl, telling her that he is back. They decide to marry, unconcerned with the approval of her brothers.

== Characters ==
- Alexandra Bergson: the main character of the book. A strong-willed and intelligent woman. She was given the farm by her father John Bergson and over the next 16 years makes it very prosperous. She is about 40 years old in the second part of the book.
- Emil Bergson: the youngest child of John Bergson and Alexandra's mother. An intelligent, handsome, and athletic person. A university graduate. Tragically, he is in love with the unhappily married Marie Shabata. He leaves for Mexico to try to escape his temptation for Marie, but after a year he cannot resist and returns.
- Ivar: In the first part of the novel, he lives in a remote plot of land in Nebraska that is difficult to get to. Most of his neighbors think he is crazy. He doesn't attend church, but reads the Swedish Bible and has a mystic quality about him. He also has a great affinity for animals, especially birds. After he fails to "prove up" on his homestead, Alexandra takes him in as a servant to save him from being sent to a lunatic asylum.
- Carl Linstrum: Alexandra's close childhood friend. As an adult, her suitor and husband.
- Signa: the youngest of Alexandra's Swedish-born servants, her favorite.
- Barney Flinn: Alexandra's foreman.
- Mrs. Hiller: a neighbor.
- Nelse Jensen: Signa's suitor, then husband.
- Annie Lee: Lou's wife's maiden name.
- Mrs. Lee: Lou's mother-in-law. She clings to old ways, although her daughter Annie and son-in-law Lou try to force her to become modern and refined. One of Alexandra's friends.
- Milly: Annie's 15-year-old daughter. She plays the organ and the piano (which Alexandra bought for her).
- Stella: Annie's younger daughter.
- Marie Tovesky Shabata: A charming female neighbor who has known the Bergsons since childhood. She is warm towards everyone without prejudice or favor, which infuriates her husband Frank, as well as Emil, who harbors romantic feelings for her despite her marriage.
- Frank Shabata: Marie's husband. He has a short temper and does not get along with most of his neighbors. He kills his wife Marie and her lover Emil in a drunken rage, and is sent to prison in Lincoln.
- Albert Tovesky: Marie's father; an adviser in Omaha. He does not approve of her husband Frank and discouraged her choice to marry him.
- Amédée Chevalier: a French-American farmer and lifelong friend of Emil.
- Angélique Chevalier: Amédée's wife.
- Father Duchesne: the French priest.
- Raoul Marcel: a good friend to Emil
- Moses Marcel: Raoul's father.
- Mr. Schwartz: the warden at the prison where Frank is being kept.

== Allusions ==
=== Literary ===
- The epigraph is taken from the Polish national epic Pan Tadeusz by Adam Mickiewicz.
- Marie is first described as being dressed as a Kate Greenaway character would be.
- In the first chapter, the children are said to be reading works by Hans Christian Andersen and The Swiss Family Robinson.
- In the fourth chapter, Alexandra is said to like to read Henry Wadsworth Longfellow's poetry.
- Many copies of the book are accompanied by the poem "Pioneers! O Pioneers!" by Walt Whitman, which is said to be where the title comes from.
- The romance between Emil and Marie and their death alludes to the similarly tragic lovers Pyramus and Thisbe, from Ovid's book Metamorphoses. Clear evidence of this occurs on page 173 where "the white mulberries...were covered with a dark stain", directly corresponding to Ovid: nam color in pomo est.

=== Historical ===
- In the first chapter of Part II, Emil and Marie mention John Huss.
- In the first chapter of Part II, Emil's letters are said to mention Porfirio Díaz.
- In the second chapter of Part II, Lou mentions William Jennings Bryan.

== Literary significance ==
In a 1921 interview for Bookman, Willa Cather said, "I decided not to 'write' at all, – simply to give myself up to the pleasure of recapturing in memory people and places I'd forgotten."

== Literary criticism ==
In “Damming the Stream: Willa Cather," Helen Fiddyment Levy examines the ways in which several of Cather's works represent the landscape of the Great Plains and female empowerment. According to Levy, "O Pioneers!" deals with these themes by invoking the Nebraskan environment and using Alexandra to subvert traditional gender roles through her appearance, her decision not to marry, and her intelligence, which is represented as superior to that of men like her brothers.

Bruce Baker II’s “Nebraska Regionalism in Selected Works of Willa Cather” analyzes Cather's depiction of the unforgiving Nebraskan landscape in O Pioneers! and other works, as well as its inhabitants' relationships to the land as they attempt to successfully farm and cultivate it.

== Background ==
Cather had moved to New York, and wrote the novel in part while living in Cherry Valley with Isabelle McClung. She completed it at the McClungs' home in Pittsburgh.

== Television film adaptation ==
The novel was adapted into a television film produced and directed by Glenn Jordan and written by Robert W. Lenski. It originally aired as a Hallmark Hall of Fame presentation on February 2, 1992, on CBS, and stars Jessica Lange.
