= One of Ours =

1922 novel by Willa Cather

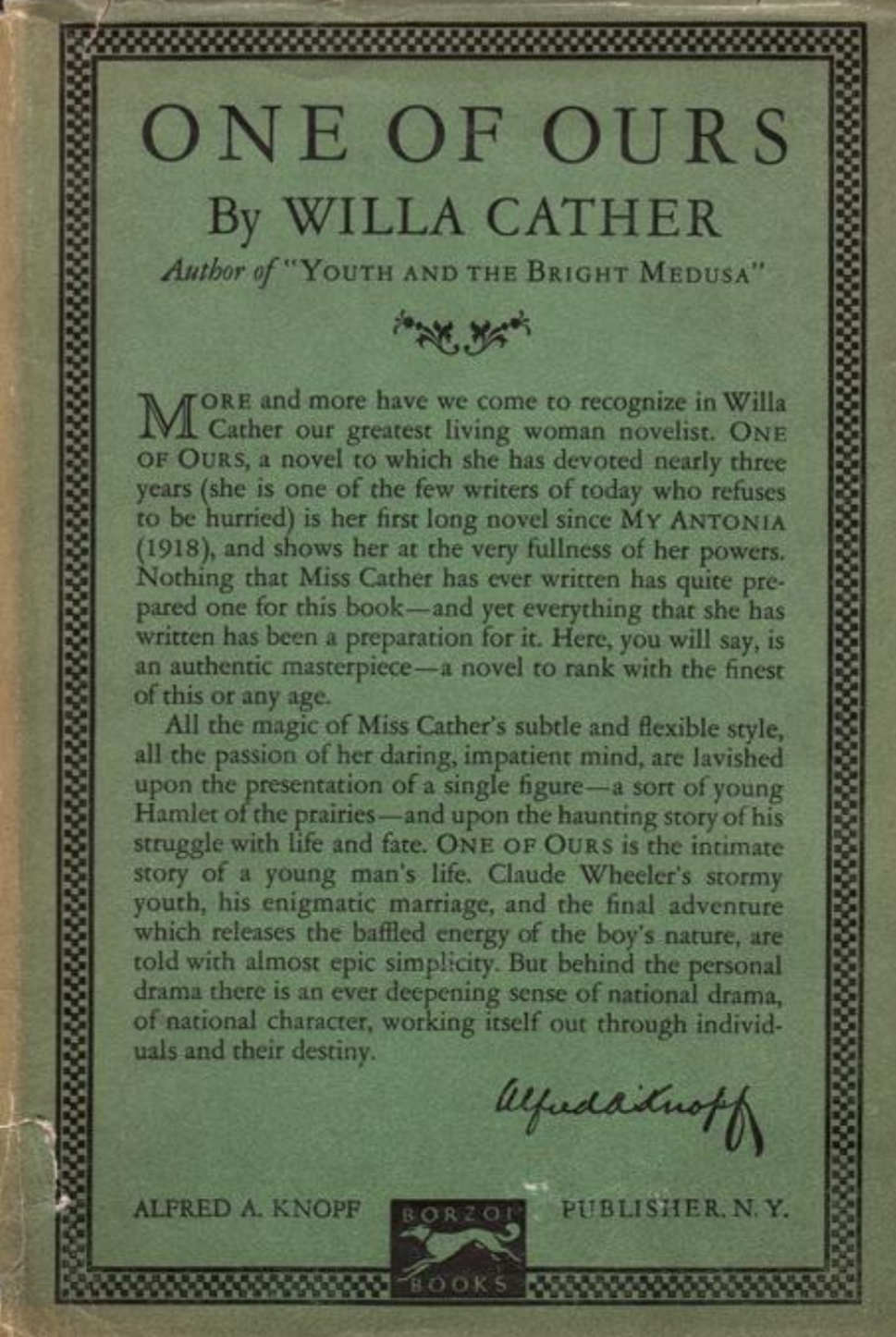
- First edition
- Author: Willa Cather
- Language: English
- Genre: Historical Fiction
- Publisher: Alfred A. Knopf
- Publication date: 1922
- Publication place: United States
- Media type: Hardcover
- Pages: 459
- OCLC: 280665
- Dewey Decimal: 813/.52 22
- LC Class: PS3505.A87 O5 2006
- Text: One of Ours at Wikisource

One of Ours is a 1922 novel by Willa Cather that won the 1923 Pulitzer Prize for the Novel. It tells the story of the life of Claude Wheeler, a Nebraska native in the first decades of the 20th century. The son of a successful farmer and an intensely pious mother, he is guaranteed a comfortable livelihood. Nevertheless, Wheeler views himself as a victim of his father's success and his own inexplicable malaise.

== Composition ==
Cather's cousin Grosvenor P. (G.P.) Cather was born and raised on the farm that adjoined her own family's, and she combined parts of her own personality with Grosvenor's in the character of Claude. Cather explained in a letter to Dorothy Canfield Fisher:

We were very much alike, and very different. He could never escape from the misery of being himself, except in action, and whatever he put his hand to turned out either ugly or ridiculous.... I was staying on his father's farm when the war broke out. We spent the first week hauling wheat to town. On those long rides on the wheat, we talked for the first time in years, and I saw some of the things that were really in the back of his mind.... I had no more thought of writing a story about him than of writing about my own nose. It was all too painfully familiar. It was just to escape from him and his kind that I wrote at all.

Grosvenor was killed in action in World War I in 1918 during the Battle of Cantigny, France. Cather learned of his death while reading the newspaper in a hair salon. She wrote:

From that on, he was in my mind. The too-personal-ness, the embarrassment of kinship, was gone. But he was in my mind so much that I couldn't get through him to other things ... some of me was buried with him in France, and some of him was left alive in me.

He was awarded the Distinguished Service Cross and a Silver Star citation for bravery under fire, of which Cather wrote:

That anything so glorious could have happened to anyone so disinherited of hope. Timidly, angrily, he used to ask me about the geography of France on the wheat wagon. Well, he learned it, you see.

Cather was unhappy that the novel "will be classed as a war story", which was not her intention. She departed from her previous practice of writing about the western life she knew well to write this story set partly in military life and overseas only because "it stood between me and anything else."

Cather was working on the novel during a visit to Canada in the summer of 1919 and finished it in Toronto in 1921. She used her cousin's letters and those of David Hochstein, a New York violinist who served as the model for Claude's wartime friend David Gerhardt. She interviewed veterans and wounded soldiers in hospitals, focusing especially on the experience of rural Nebraskans she profiled in a magazine article, "Roll Call on the Prairie". She visited the French battlefields as well.

== Plot ==
While attending Temple College, Claude tries to convince his parents that attending the State University would give him a better education. His parents ignore his pleas and Claude continues at the Christian college. After a football game, Claude meets and befriends the Erlich family, quickly adapting his own world perception to the Erlichs' love of music, free-thinking, and debate. His career at university and his friendship with the Erlichs are dramatically interrupted, however, when his father expands the family farm and Claude is obligated to leave university and operate part of the family farm.

Once pinned to the farm, Claude marries Enid Royce, a childhood friend. His notions of love and marriage are quickly devastated when it becomes apparent that Enid is more interested in political activism and Christian missionary work than she is in loving and caring for Claude. When Enid departs for China to care for her missionary sister, who has suddenly fallen ill, Claude moves back to his family's farm. As World War I begins in Europe, the family is fixated on every development from overseas. When the United States decides to enter the war, Claude enlists in the US Army.

Finally believing he has found a purpose in life beyond the drudgery of farming and marriage, Claude revels in his freedom and new responsibilities. Despite an influenza epidemic and the continuing hardships of the battlefield, Claude has never felt as though he has mattered more. His pursuit of vague notions of purpose and principle culminates in a ferocious front-line encounter with an overwhelming German onslaught.

== Major themes ==
The novel is divided into two parts: the first half in Nebraska, where Claude Wheeler struggles to find his life's purpose and is left disappointed, and the second in France, where his pursuit of purpose is vindicated. A romantic unfulfilled by marriage and an idealist without an ideal to cling to, Wheeler fulfills his romantic idealism on the brutal battlefields of 1918 France.

One of Ours has been described as portrayal of a young American man born after the closing of the frontier era, whose restlessness leads him to seek purpose through military service during the First World War. The novel also explores themes of identity, belonging, and the protagonist's connection to France in contrast to his experiences in the United States.

== Criticism ==
Sinclair Lewis praised the Nebraska portion of the work—"truth does guide the first part of the book"—but wrote that in the second half Cather had produced a "romance of violinists gallantly turned soldiers, of self-sacrificing sergeants, sallies at midnight, and all the commonplaces of ordinary war novels". H. L. Mencken, who had praised her earlier work, wrote that in depicting the war Cather's effort "drops precipitately to the level of a serial in The Lady's Home Journal...fought out not in France, but on a Hollywood movie-lot."

Ernest Hemingway thought it overrated despite its sales and in a letter to Edmund Wilson made an observation that a later critic has called "blatantly chauvinistic": "Wasn't that last scene in the [battle] lines wonderful? Do you know where it came from? The battle scene in Birth of a Nation. I identified episode after episode, Catherized. Poor woman, she had to get her war experience somewhere."

The novel won Cather a larger readership than her earlier work, though the critical reception was not as positive. The novel has been compared unfavorably to other novels of World War I, like Three Soldiers by John Dos Passos, written from a disillusioned and anti-war point of view. Cather's protagonist, by contrast, escapes from an unhappy marriage and his purposeless life in Nebraska and finds his life's purpose in his wartime service and military comradeship, especially the friendship of David Gerhardt, a violinist. Cather, writes one critic, "committed heresy by appearing to argue that the First World War had actually been an inspiring, even liberating experience for some of its combatants."

== Additional sources ==
- Steven Trout, "Willa Cather's One of Ours and the Iconography of Remembrance," in Robert Thacker and Michael A. Peterman, eds., Willa Cather's Canadian and Old World Connections, Cather Studies, vol. 4 (University of Nebraska Press, 1999), available online
