= Tommy, the Unsentimental =

1896 short story by Willa Cather

- Short story by Willa Cather
- Country: United States
- Language: English
- Genre: Short story

Publication
- Published in: Home Monthly
- Publication type: Women's magazine
- Publication date: August 1896

"Tommy, the Unsentimental" is a short story by Willa Cather. It was first published in Home Monthly in August 1896.

== Plot summary ==
Jay works in Thomas Shirley, Sr's bank until his relationship with Tommy gets strained and he is sent to Red Willow, another town some twenty miles north. Tommy goes to college in the East, then comes back. One day, Tommy receives a telegram asking her to come and help him as there is trouble at the bank he is working. She bikes there with Miss Jessica but leaves her on the way as the other woman is tired and they don't have time to wait. When she gets there, she solves the problem and tells him he should marry Miss Jessica, as she feels for him. He protests, saying he feels for her, not Jessica, but she laughs away the suggestion.

== Characters ==
- Tommy, a.k.a. Thomas Shirley. Her real name is Theodosia; she is a girl. She has 'big land interests in Wyoming'.
- Jay Ellington Harper, a bank cashier.
- Miss Jessica
- Joe Elsworth
- Joe Sawyer
- Thomas Shirley, Sr

== Allusions to actual history ==
- Jay compares the bank customers to the Ghost Dance, linked to Wovoka and ultimately to the Wounded Knee Massacre.
