= Edith Lewis =

American magazine editor

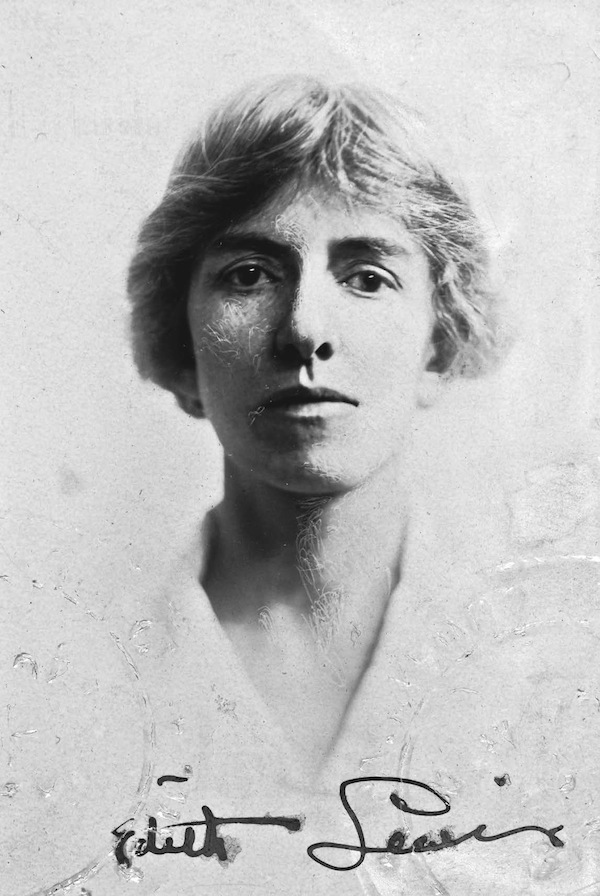
- Lewis's passport photograph, 1920
- Born: December 22, 1882; Lincoln, Nebraska, U.S.
- Died: August 11, 1972 (aged 89); New York City, U.S.
- Occupations: Magazine editor, McClure's Magazine
- Partner: Willa Cather (c. 1908–1947)

Edith Lewis (December 22, 1882 – August 11, 1972) was a magazine editor at McClure's Magazine, the managing editor of Every Week Magazine, and an advertising copywriter at J. Walter Thompson. Lewis was Willa Cather's domestic partner and was named executor of Cather's literary estate in Cather's will. After Cather's death, Lewis published a memoir of Cather in 1953 titled Willa Cather Living.

== Early life ==
Edith Labaree Lewis was born in Lincoln, Nebraska, on December 22, 1882, to Henry Euclid Lewis and Lillie Gould. She is a direct descendant of a Mayflower pilgrim, and her mother's and father's families had been moving west from New England since the decades after the Civil War.

Lewis graduated from Smith College in 1902 as an English major. Following her graduation, she relocated to her hometown, Lincoln, Nebraska, to teach for a year. While in Lincoln, she met Willa Cather for the first time at the home of the publisher of the Lincoln Courier, Sarah Harris.

== Career ==
Scholars have historically painted Lewis in the context of Willa Cather's career as a copy editor or secretary, but recent research has indicated that Lewis had a rich editorial and professional career that had a significant impact upon Cather's creative process.

According to scholar Melissa Homestead, Lewis shaped Cather's prose alongside one another in a sort of "parallel silent activity in domestic space." At times, their collective editing of a single copy of a work, including written comments, became "so intertwined they are nearly inseparable."

Although Cather never dedicated her writing to Lewis, there is an apparent shared ownership between the two of them, informed by their domestic and emotional relationship to one another. Homestead argues that it is time for scholars to "unlock the garret door in our scholarly imaginations to let in the woman with whom (rather than for whom) Cather wrote her fiction."

Lewis' influence may be seen in Cather's 1918 novel, My Antonia. According to Homestead, Lewis' position as assistant editor of Every Week magazine may have inspired Cather's themes because Every Week often published western genre fiction.

The pair traveled together to the American Southwest, which Homestead argues had a great influence on Cather's novels, The Professor's House and Death Comes for the Archbishop.

== Personal life ==
Lewis shared a home with Willa Cather in New York City for almost 40 years. When Lewis acquired a summer cottage on the island of Grand Manan in New Brunswick, Canada, in 1926, the two shared a summer home there.

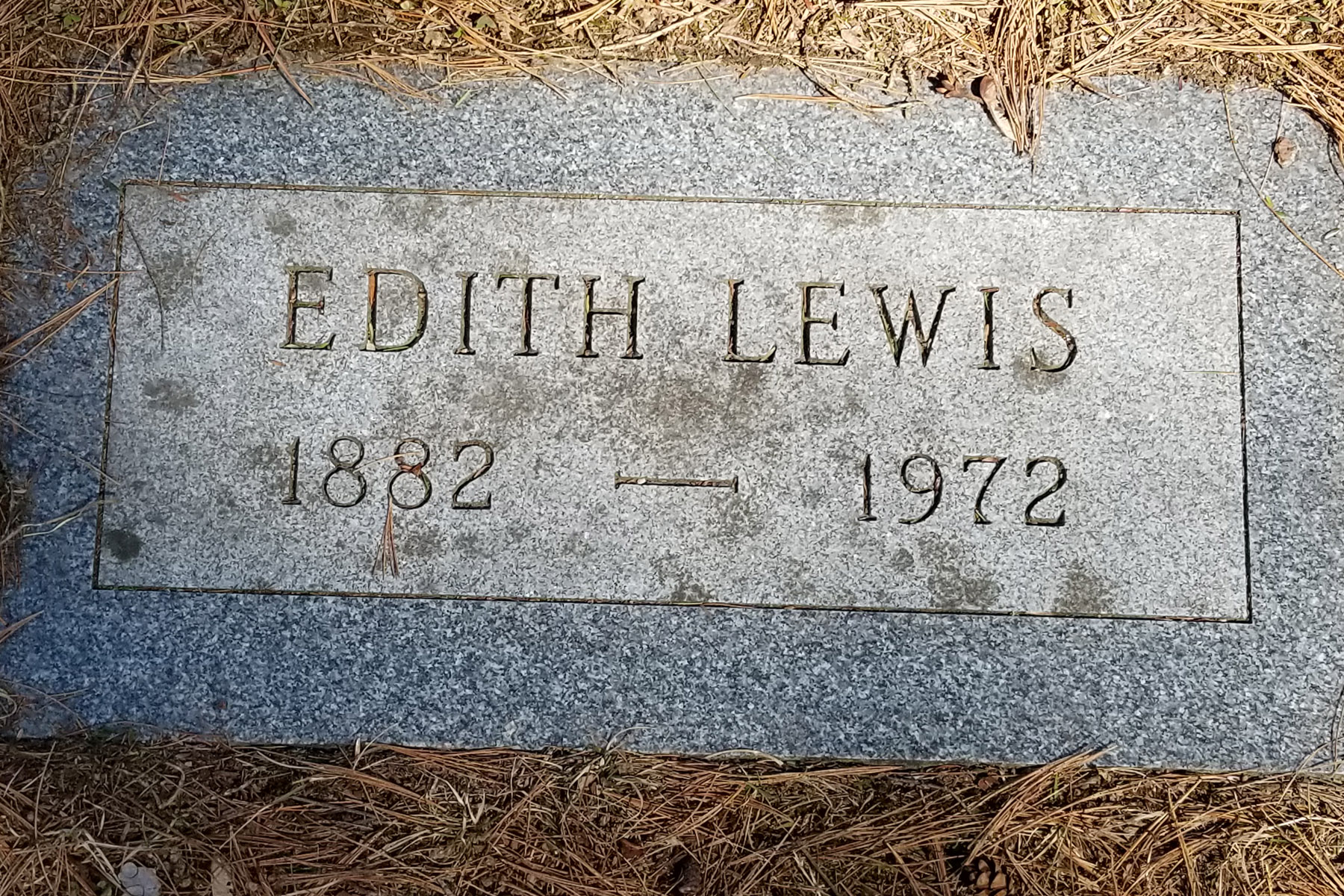
Edith Lewis' grave in Jaffrey, New Hampshire

From 1913 to 1927, Lewis and Cather lived at 5 Bank St. in Greenwich Village. The pair moved into an apartment on Park Avenue in 1932. As construction of the Broadway-Seventh Avenue New York City Subway line began, the 5 Bank St. apartment was scheduled for demolition, so Cather and Lewis moved out.

Lewis died on August 11, 1972. She is buried beside Cather in Jaffrey, New Hampshire.

As with Cather, scholars tend to disagree about Lewis' sexuality. Homestead's research has led her to make the argument that Cather and Lewis were in a relationship that included same-sex attraction, and in doing so, asked: "What kind of evidence is needed to establish this as a lesbian relationship? Photographs of the two of them in bed together? She was an integral part of Cather's life, creatively and personally."

== Works ==
- Lewis, Edith (2000). Willa Cather Living: A Personal Record. Lincoln: University of Nebraska Press. ISBN 9780803279964. OCLC 44467311.
