= The Old Beauty and Others =

1948 short story collection by Willa Cather

- First edition book cover
- Author: Willa Cather
- Language: English
- Genre: Historical fiction
- Publisher: Alfred A. Knopf (New York)
- Publication date: 1948
- Publication place: United States
- Media type: Print (hardback & paperback)
- Pages: 166
- OCLC: 280656

The Old Beauty and Others is a collection of short stories by Willa Cather, published in 1948 after her death.

== Contents ==
This collection contains the following stories:

- The Old Beauty
- The Best Years
- Before Breakfast
