= Whale Cove, New Brunswick =

Inlet in New Brunswick, Canada

Coordinates: 44°46′25″N 66°45′25″W

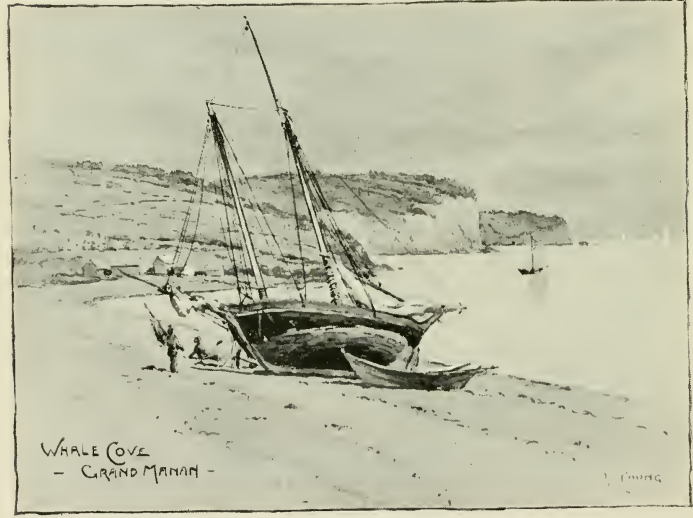
Whale Cove, Grand Manan - in an 1893 sketch

Whale Cove is a cove on Grand Manan Island in North Head, New Brunswick, Canada. It is located in the northern part of the island, on the Bay of Fundy, near North Head. The cove's once busy fishing wharf was destroyed in the Groundhog gale of 1976.

== Climate ==
Climate data for North Head
Month	Jan	Feb	Mar	Apr	May	Jun	Jul	Aug	Sep	Oct	Nov	Dec	Year
Mean daily maximum °C (°F)	0 (32)	0 (32)	2 (35)	8 (46)	13 (55)	18 (64)	21 (69)	20 (68)	17 (62)	12 (53)	7 (44)	2 (35)	10 (50)
Mean daily minimum °C (°F)	−9 (15)	−9 (15)	−4 (24)	0 (32)	4 (39)	9 (48)	12 (53)	12 (53)	9 (48)	5 (41)	0 (32)	−6 (21)	1 (33)
Average precipitation mm (inches)	120 (4.7)	99 (3.9)	110 (4.4)	86 (3.4)	91 (3.6)	81 (3.2)	71 (2.8)	84 (3.3)	91 (3.6)	110 (4.2)	130 (5.2)	110 (4.5)	1,190 (46.7)
Source: Weatherbase

== Notable residents ==
The American writer Willa Cather began spending her summers in Whale Cove in 1921 and eventually had a cottage built there. The cottage is still open to the public as a tourist site.
