= Neighbour Rosicky =

1930 short story by Willa Cather

- Short story by Willa Cather
- Country: United States
- Language: English
- Genre: Short story

Publication
- Published in: Woman's Home Companion
- Publication type: Women's magazine
- Publication date: 1930

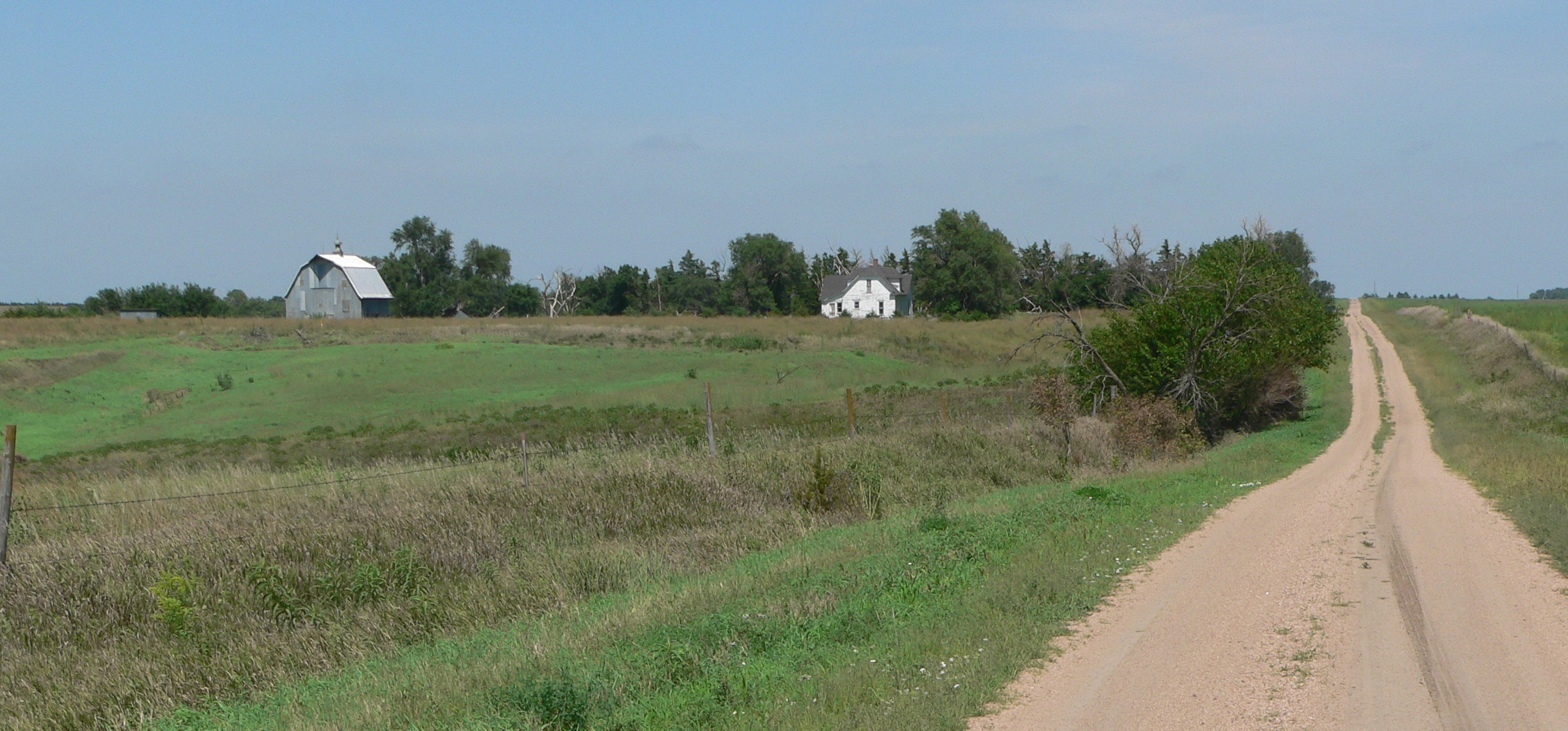
Pavelka farmstead in rural Webster County, Nebraska, setting of "Neighbour Rosicky"

"Neighbour Rosicky" is a short story by Willa Cather. It appeared in the Woman's Home Companion in 1930, under the title "Neighbor Rosicky". In 1932, it was published in the collection Obscure Destinies.

== Part One ==
“Neighbour Rosicky” is the story of a 65-year-old Czech farmer, Anton Rosicky, who now resides in Nebraska with his wife and six children. The story begins with Anton at Dr. Ed Burleigh's office, where he learns that he has a bad heart. The doctor informs him that he can no longer continue to work the fields, and should stick to less strenuous chores about the home and barn.

The Rosicky family's kindness is reflected in Dr. Burleigh's (whom the family refers to as “Dr. Ed”) recollection of the hospitality shown in their home after delivering a neighbor's baby. He reflects on gossip he's heard about the Rosickys, that their farm never turns a significant profit, as do some of the nearby farms. But rather than feel sorry for them, he respects them for valuing relationship over money.

== Part Two ==
On his way home from the doctor's, Rosicky stops at the general store to buy fabric and candy for his wife. Before returning home, he stops to admire the graveyard that borders his property. The snow reminds him that winter brings rest for nature and man.

When he arrives home he explains to his wife that his heart “ain’t so good like it used to be.” Together they recall their loving marriage, and the difference between themselves and the other farmers in the area. The Rosickys prefer to live happy and keep their children healthy, rather than having money and selling their cream off to a creamery.

== Part Three ==
Out of worry, Mary travels to see Dr. Burleigh to find out more about Rosicky's heart. After her visit, she talks with her boys to make sure that he is not doing anything too strenuous. Finally, Rosicky stops fighting and gives in to the doctor's orders.

Rosicky spends his time that winter staying indoors doing carpentry and tailoring. He kept all of his tools on a shelf in "Father’s corner". While sewing, he begins thinking about his past tailoring in New York City when he first came to America. Although his wages were adequate, he did not save any money because he loaned it out to friends, went to the opera, and spent it on girls. He was unhappy in the city, and realized that he needed to be in contact with the earth; so at the age of 35, he moved west to Nebraska to start a new life as a farmer.

== Part Four ==
Rosicky's oldest son, Rudolph, and his “American” wife, Polly, rent a farm close by. Rosicky is worried about their marriage because Polly is a city girl, not used to having to be on a farm. He is concerned that because of Polly's unhappiness, Rudolph will take a job in the city where he can make more money, and she can be around the life she is accustomed to. Rosicky offers to loan them the family car to go into town on this and future Saturday evenings. To make sure they go out that night, Rosicky also does the dishes and cleans up the kitchen for Polly.

== Part Five ==
On the day before Christmas, Rosicky is reminded of his time in London, where he was faced with the difficulties of finding food and shelter. He begins to worry about the crops and if they will be able to handle the tough winter that is ahead of them. Mary attempts to lighten the mood by reminding him of a year in which the heat destroyed the crops around the Fourth of July, and how he showed no despair at that time. This is followed by numerous stories told back and forth amongst the family, one of which recounts an episode when Rosicky was in London and stole a goose from his landlady. Afterwards, he felt such guilt that he searched the city to find a way to replace it, eventually meeting wealthy Czechs who gave him the money he needed. Polly is extremely moved by this story, and decides that she wants to invite Rudolph's family to their home for New Year's dinner.

== Part VI ==
At the end of the story, Rosicky imagines the future of his children and hopes that they do not suffer like he did throughout the beginning part of his life. Rosicky goes to Rudolph's farm to help him tend to the alfalfa field. The strenuous labor causes him to have a heart attack, and Polly comes to Rosicky's aid and calls him “Father” for the first time. Rosicky starts to feel better. She realizes that his gratefulness and compassion comes across as a love that no one has ever shown her before. Rudolph and Polly later take Rosicky back to his home, where he dies the next morning of a heart attack

At the end of the story, Dr. Burleigh stops at the graveyard where Rosicky is buried to pay his respects. He reflects on Rosicky's fulfilling life and how it “seemed to him complete and beautiful.”

== Literary criticism ==
In 1883, at age nine, Willa Cather moved with her family from Virginia to the plains of Nebraska. In the thinly settled Divide between the Blue and Republican rivers, she encountered and learned the stories of immigrants from a variety of backgrounds. Clifton Fadiman, in a review of Cather's work, states “no one has better commemorated the virtues of the Bohemian and Scandinavian immigrants whose enterprise and heroism won an empire.”

In “Neighbour Rosicky” Cather portrays a realistic image of the immigration and settlement process, through Anton Rosicky's story. She specifically represents the Czech immigrant ideals which are independence, hard work, family unity, and freedom.
