= Shadows on the Rock =

1931 novel by Willa Cather

- First edition
- Author: Willa Cather
- Language: English
- Genre: Historical novel
- Publisher: Alfred A. Knopf
- Publication date: 1931
- Publication place: Canada
- Media type: Print (Hardback & Paperback)
- Pages: 280 pp
- OCLC: 32468152
- Dewey Decimal: 813/.52 20
- LC Class: PS3505.A87 S5 1995

Shadows on the Rock is a novel by the American writer Willa Cather, published in 1931. The novel covers one year of the lives of Cecile Auclair and her father Euclide, French colonists in Quebec. Like many of Cather's books, the story is driven by detailed portraits of the characters, rather than a narrative plot. The novel will enter the American public domain on January 1, 2027. (Note: Copyright renewed under R225125)

== Plot ==
Book I: The Apothecary

The story opens in 1697 in Quebec. Euclide Auclair stands on Cap Diamant overlooking the river, watching as the last ship of the season returns to France. He comes down to dinner with his daughter, Cécile. After dinner, Cécile feeds Blinker, a partially disabled man who does some of the heavy chores.

Euclide Auclair came to the Quebec colony eight years prior, in the service of Count de Frontenac, as physician and apothecary. His wife has died after an illness, and the duties of housekeeping have devolved upon his daughter Cécile.

The following day, Cécile and Euclide attend to Reverend Mother Juschereau, who has sprained her ankle. Her father replenishes the hospital supplies while Mother Juschereau tells Cécile a story.

Book II: Cécile and Jacques

On market day, in late October, Euclide goes to buy vegetables to store in his root cellar. A description is given of citizens growing lettuce and root vegetables in cold frames in their cellars during the long winter. He goes to the church to say a prayer and notices Jacques, the son of a dissolute woman, also saying his prayers.

Cécile goes to Governor Frontenac to ask for a pair of shoes for Jacques. He praises her for her charity and industry, and asks if she would like anything for herself. She asks to look at his bowl of glass fruit, and he reminisces about his experiences in Turkey, where the glass was made.

Euclide sends Cécile with medicine to the convent. Cécile runs into Jacques and sitting in the chapel, she tells him a story. They light a candle. As they leave, they meet Bishop Laval. We learn, in a flashback, that Bishop Laval saved Jacques from freezing in a snowstorm, though Jacques does not entirely remember this.

Cécile takes Jacques to the cobbler to be measured for shoes. She reviews the collection of wooden feet that the cobbler has made to represent the measure of the feet of his wealthy customers.

On Christmas Eve day, Cécile opens a gift that has been sent by her Aunt Clotilde in France – a crèche (nativity scene). Cécile and Jacques assemble the figures in a stable of pine branches. Jacques contributes a figure of a beaver to the scene.

Book III: The Long Winter

The young Bishop Saint-Vallier calls at Auclair's shop for sugared fruit. We learn that Bishop Saint-Vallier has undone the system of education and parish management instituted over twenty years by Bishop Laval. Euclide does not like the young bishop because of his extravagant way of life, his snubbing of the older bishop, and because he believes Saint-Vallier makes poor decisions. Euclide derides him a "less like a churchman than a courtier".

We learn that Blinker was a torturer in the king's service in France, and that he did not wish this trade – it was forced upon him. He had come to Quebec to get away from this employment, but is haunted by the deaths of his victims.

Book IV: Pierre Charron

In June, a fur-trader named Pierre Charron calls on Euclide. He tells many stories to Euclide and Cécile, and accompanies Cécile on a visit to friends on the Île d'Orléans.

Book V: The ships from France

With many of their fellow townsfolk, Cécile and Jacques go down to the harbor to watch as five ships arrive from France. There is a general celebration. Cécile receives packages from her two French aunts containing clothing and jewelry.

Cécile is scheduled to return to France when the ships leave at the end of summer, but is having reservations. She tells her father that she is concerned about who will look after her friend Jacques. Her father takes no notice, and she is quite upset. She goes to the church to pray, and runs into Bishop Laval, to whom she relates her troubles.

Book VI: The Dying Count

The Count learns that, despite his expectations, he is not being recalled to France. He tells Euclide that he is released from his service and may return to France, but Euclide chooses to remain. The Count tells Euclide that he is dying, and directs him to take the bowl of glass fruit to Cécile as a gift. Some time later, the Count passes away.

The two bishops resolve their differences.

Cécile does not go to France.

Epilogue

The epilogue takes place fifteen years later, in 1713. Bishop Saint-Vallier returns to New France after thirteen years of absence, including several years of captivity in England, which has left him humbled and changed. Cécile has married Pierre Charron, and they are raising four boys.

== Characters ==
- Euclide Auclair, an apothecary
- Cécile Auclair, his daughter
- Count de Frontenac, a military officer and the governor of the Quebec colony
- Blinker, a poor disabled man whom Cecile charitably feeds
- Antoinette Gaux, a prostitute, and the neglectful mother of Jacques
- Jacques Gaux, the son of Antoinette and friend of Cecile
- Bishop Laval, the elder churchman
- Bishop Saint-Vallier, a younger churchman with rather poor judgment
- Pierre Charron, a hunter and fur trader
