= The Joy of Nelly Deane =

1911 short story by Willa Cather

- Short story by Willa Cather
- Country: United States
- Language: English
- Genre: Short story

Publication
- Published in: Century
- Publication type: Illustrated monthly magazine
- Publication date: October 1911

"The Joy of Nelly Deane" is a short story by American writer Willa Cather. It was first published in Century in October 1911.

== Plot summary ==
After rehearsing for a choir, Nelly asks Peggy to walk back home in Riverbend with her and keep her away from Scott, who wants to walk her back. After the performance, Peggy sleeps over at Nelly's, and the latter tells her she is engaged to Guy Franklin. After graduation, Peggy moves to Denver, Colorado with her family. She later receives a latter from Mrs Dow saying Mr Deane has lost money in an investment in Cripple Creek, Colorado, Franklin ended up marrying a woman in Long Pine, Nebraska, and Nelly is a teacher at the local school. The following winter, Peggy stops at Riverbend, where Nelly is to join the Baptist faith and marry Scott. The day after the baptism, Nelly confesses to being unhappy to Peggy.

After living in Rome for years, Peggy receives another letter from Mr Dow announcing Nelly's death subsequent to her second child's birth. Both children are now being looked after by Mrs Spinny, the Deanes having died. Back in Riverbend, Mrs Dow explains to Peggy that Nelly died because she was looked after by the wrong doctor - Scott had fallen out with two other good doctors. Finally, Peggy meets Margaret whilst she is sledging on Lupton's Hill, and Mrs Spinny also shows her the new baby, who reaches for the flower in her hat.

== Characters ==
- Nelly Deane, a popular girl.
- Peggy, the narrator.
- Mrs Dow
- Mrs Freeze
- Mrs Spinny. She looks after Nelly's children subsequent to her death.
- Scott Spinny, Mrs Spinny's son.
- Guy Franklin, a travelling trader. He often travels to and from Chicago, and later moves to Long Pine, Nebraska, where he gets married.
- Mrs Deane, Nelly's mother.
- Jud Deane, Nelly's father.
- Margaret, Nelly's daughter.
- Doctor Tom, a doctor Scott has fallen out with.
- Doctor Jones, a doctor Scott has fallen out with.
- Doctor Fox, the incompetent doctor who looks after Nelly before she dies.

== Allusions to other works ==
- In childhood, Nelly and Peggy are said to be rehearsing for Queen Esther.
- The Bible, with Hagar and Ishmael, is mentioned.

== Allusions to actual history ==
- Julius Caesar is mentioned twice.
