= Obscure Destinies =

1932 collection of short stories by Willa Cather

- First edition book cover
- Author: Willa Cather
- Language: English
- Genre: Short story collection
- Publisher: Alfred A. Knopf
- Publication date: 1932
- Publication place: United States
- Media type: Print

Obscure Destinies is a collection of three short stories by Willa Cather, published in 1932. Each story deals with the death of a central character and asks how the ordinary lives of these characters can be valued and how "beauty was found or created in seemingly ordinary circumstances".

== Contents ==
This collection contains the following stories:

- "Neighbour Rosicky"
- "Old Mrs. Harris"
- "Two Friends"
