= Alexander's Bridge =

1912 novel by Willa Cather

- First edition
- Author: Willa Cather
- Language: English
- Publisher: Houghton Mifflin
- Publication date: 1912
- Publication place: United States
- Media type: Print (hardback & paperback)

Alexander's Bridge is the first novel by American author Willa Cather. First published in 1912, it was re-released with an author's preface in 1922. It also ran as a serial in McClure's, giving Cather some free time from her work for that magazine.

== Plot introduction ==
Bartley Alexander is a construction engineer and world-renowned builder of bridges undergoing a mid-life crisis. Although married to Winifred, Bartley resumes his acquaintance with a former lover, Hilda Burgoyne, in London. The affair gnaws at Bartley's sense of propriety and honor.

== Plot summary ==
Professor Wilson arrives at the Alexanders' house in Boston, Bartley Alexander having persuaded him to attend a Congress of Psychologists in the city. He is greeted by Winifred Alexander. When her husband comes home the men talk; Winifred plays the piano for them. The next day, she tells Wilson how she met her husband through her aunt.

On Christmas Eve, the Alexanders prepare for Christmas dinner. Bartley tells Wilson he is having trouble with a bridge in Canada. Later he gives his wife pearl earrings. On New Year's Day, Alexander makes ready to leave for London. On the ship, he endures sharp gales and goes into a bar, where he gambles at bridge, the card game. In London, Bartley visits Hilda and tells her he cannot go on having two relationships; she must forget about him and leave him alone. She is distressed. The day before he is due to return to America however, he takes her out to dinner.

Later, Hugh MacConnell walks Hilda back to her house on a foggy day. She says she isn't attracted to him; they are just close friends. In her house, she receives a letter from Bartley, saying he is going mad away from her. This prompts her to visit him in America to tell him she will marry another man; Bartley doesn't like the idea. They spend one last evening together.

Soon afterward, Philip Horton calls Bartley to Canada to inspect the bridge. Bartley discovers that one of the lower chords is failing, compromising the structural integrity of the entire bridge. Horton had been concerned that the bridge was not safe and had attempted to contact Bartley to have him inspect the bridge earlier – on the very day Bartley was with Hilda. While Bartley is on the bridge telling the work crews to stop working because the bridge was unsafe, the bridge collapses, killing Bartley and many of the workers. Bartley's body is recovered the next day and taken to Horton's house. Winifred comes back to make arrangements for her husband's corpse. Finally, Wilson visits Hilda. The latter expresses her envy of Winifred. Wilson reminds her that Winifred is now bereft and will be haunted by Bartley's death. Hilda concludes that she will be too.

== Characters ==
- Professor Lucius Wilson, a professor of philosophy. He was a student in Boston and now lectures in a Western university
- Mrs Winifred Alexander
- Mr Bartley Alexander, a bridge builder
- Thomas, the Alexanders' servant
- MacKeller, a Scottish engineer who brought Bartley from London to Quebec when he was younger; he was a friend of Eleanor Pemberton's
- Mrs Eleanor Pemberton, Winifred's aunt
- Maurice Mainhall, a popular man amongst writers
- Hugh MacConnell, a playwright
- Florence Merrill
- Cyril Henderson
- Hilda Burgoyne, Bartley's erstwhile lover with whom he resumes an affair; she is an actress
- Irene Burgoyne, a member of Hilda's family
- Sir Harry Towne
- Lord Westmere
- Lady Dowle
- Lady Westmere
- Lady Warford
- Lady Kildare, an Irish philanthropist
- Robert Owen, Lady Kildare's nephew
- Sarah Frost, a novelist
- Mr Frost, Sarah Frost's husband
- Marie, a French girl
- Madame Anger
- Angel, Madame Anger's servant, who was from Brittany and eventually left to start affairs with soldiers
- Mrs Hastings
- Angora
- Philip Horton, he works on bridges with Bartley

== Allusions to other works ==
- Music is mentioned with Robert Schumann's Carnaval and Giuseppe Verdi's Il trovatore.
- Literature is mentioned with William Shakespeare's Sonnets and Ernest Dowson. There is also a quotation from Milton's Il Penseroso: "Forget thyself to marble".

== Allusions to actual history ==
It has been argued that the story might have been prompted by the collapse of the Quebec Bridge on August 29, 1907.
