= Death Comes for the Archbishop =

1927 novel by Willa Cather

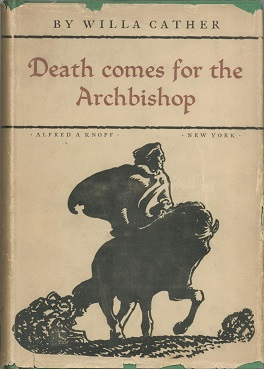
- First edition dust jacket
- Author: Willa Cather
- Language: English
- Publisher: Alfred A. Knopf
- Publication date: 1927
- Publication place: United States
- Text: Death Comes for the Archbishop online

Death Comes for the Archbishop is a 1927 novel by American author Willa Cather. It concerns the attempts of a Catholic bishop and a priest to establish a diocese in New Mexico Territory.

== Plot summary ==
The narrative is based on two historical figures of the late 19th century, Jean-Baptiste Lamy and Joseph Projectus Machebeuf, and rather than any one single plot, is the stylized re-telling of their lives serving as Roman Catholic clergy in New Mexico. The narrative has frequent digressions, either in terms of stories related to the pair (including the story of the Our Lady of Guadalupe and the execution of an oppressive Spanish priest at Acoma Pueblo) or through their recollections. The narration is in third-person omniscient style. Cather includes many fictionalized accounts of actual historical figures, including Kit Carson, Manuel Antonio Chaves and Pope Gregory XVI.

In the prologue, Bishop Ferrand, an Irish bishop who works in the New World, solicits three cardinals at Rome to pick his candidate for the newly created diocese of New Mexico (which has recently passed into American hands). Bishop Ferrand is successful in getting his candidate, the Auvergnat Jean-Marie Latour, recommended by the cardinals over the recommendation of the bishop of Durango (under whose territory New Mexico had previously fallen). One of the cardinals, a Spaniard named Allende, alludes to a painting by El Greco taken from his family by a missionary to the New World and lost, and asks for the new bishop to search for it.

The action then switches to the primary character, Bishop Jean Marie Latour, who travels with his friend and vicar Joseph Vaillant from Sandusky, Ohio to New Mexico. At the time of Latour's departure for New Mexico, Cincinnati is the end of the railway line west, so Latour must travel by riverboat to the Gulf of Mexico, and thence overland to New Mexico, a journey which takes an entire year (and includes losing most of his supplies in a shipwreck at Galveston). The names given to the main proponents reflect their characters. Vaillant, valiant, is fearless in his promulgation of the faith, whereas Latour, the tower, is more intellectual and reserved than his comrade. Vaillant, described as being ugly but purpose-filled, is given the nickname "Blanchet" ("Whitey") as well as "Trompe-la-morte" ("Death-cheater") for his complexion and his numerous instances of bad health, respectively. While the narrative speaks of Vaillant positively, it also alludes to his willingness to acquire (he "forces the hand" of a landowner into giving him and Latour two prize mules, Angelica and Contento, chastises the widow Dona Isabella Olivares for refusing to assert her rights under her husband's will and thereby blocking the church from its testamentary share, and goes on frank "begging trips" to acquire money) and near the end of the novel his questionable financial behaviour receives an investigation from Rome. Latour, again presented favourably, nevertheless does operate with a view to politics: he successfully canvasses donations to build a Romanesque cathedral in Santa Fe according to his own desires (he chooses the stone and brings the architect Molny from France to complete it), and bides his time to remove dissenting priests and help a poor Mexican slave-woman named Sada until he is in a position of political strength (his help of Sada is never described in the novel). The novel ends with the death of (retired) Archbishop Latour in Santa Fe: Vaillant has pre-deceased Latour as the first bishop of Colorado after the Colorado gold rush (in reality Machebeuf was the first Roman Catholic bishop of Denver).

Near the beginning of the novel, Latour and Vaillant are saved from being murdered by the villainous Buck Scales (at whose house they have sought shelter for the night) by Scales's abused wife Magdalena. All three escape, and Scales is hanged for the murder of four of his former guests, while Magdalena ultimately serves nuns whom Latour brings from Europe and who run a school in Santa Fe.

While some of the clergy already established in New Mexico are portrayed favourably (such as the Padre of Isleta Pueblo, the blind priest Father Jesus de Baca, who collects parrots), several of the entrenched priests are depicted as examples of greed, avarice, and gluttony. The priest of Albuquerque, Father Gallegos, is removed for not being devout enough (he dances and enjoys fine food and hunting), replaced by Vaillant. Father Martinez at Taos is removed for denying the necessity of priestly celibacy (and having children, although he is also described as starting a revolt and then profiting from the executions of the rebels to seize their property) and his friend Father Lucero at Arroyo Hondo (described as a miser) is also removed when he joins Father Martinez's new church (Martinez dies an apostate while Lucero receives absolution from Vaillant after repenting near death).

Cather portrays the aboriginal people of the Pueblos, the Hopi and the Navajo sympathetically, including a discussion of the Long Walk of the Navajo (mentioned as a reminiscence of the dying Latour of his Navajo friend Eusabio and the Navajo leader Manuelito). Latour reflects that the removal of the Navajos was a wrong comparable to "black slavery," and the narrator describes Kit Carson's actions with the Navajo as "misguided" and "a soldier's brutal work."

== Historical background ==
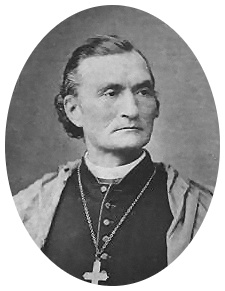
Archbishop Lamy

The novel is based on the life of Jean-Baptiste Lamy (1814–1888), and partially chronicles the construction of the Cathedral Basilica of St. Francis of Assisi. The capture of the Southwest by the United States in the Mexican–American War is the catalyst for the plot.

"The Padre of Isleta", Anton Docher is identified as the character of Padre de Baca.

Among the entities mentioned in the novel are Los Penitentes, a flagellant lay confraternity in Southern Colorado and New Mexico that still operates today.

== Publication history ==
The novel's U.S. copyright expired on January 1, 2023, when all works published in 1927 entered the public domain. The novel has been translated into twenty-four languages. The French, German and Italia translations are respectively titled La mort et L'archevêque, Der Tod kommt zum Erzbischof, and Le visite d'un vicario apostolico. It was also translated into Marathi by Vijay Tendulkar and titled Devachi Manase (देवाची माणसे).

== Significance and criticism ==
The novel was reprinted in the Modern Library series in 1931. It was included in Life magazine's list of the 100 outstanding books of 1924–1944. It was also included on Time's 100 Best English-language Novels from 1923 to 2005 and Modern Library's list of the 100 best English-language novels of the 20th century and was chosen by the Western Writers of America to be the 7th-best "Western Novel" of the 20th century.

James Paul Old of Valparaiso University uses Death Comes for the Archbishop as a literary example of the notion that religious faith is able to develop and maintain strong social bonds in nascent democratic political orders. He argues that even though Cather's early novels, such as My Ántonia, typically represent religious characters as closed-minded, her personal religious realignment at the time allowed her to alter her perspective and develop more positive religious characters, in this case Catholic ones. While some of her contemporary critics found her out of step with the experiences of common people, later critics, such as Old, praised her for a "search for a basis of order and cultural stability beyond the confines of contemporary secular culture."

Additionally, scholars note that Latour's character is not strictly placed within the male-female binary, but instead, as Jennifer A. Smith argues, "oscillates between norms of femininity and masculinity." In developing a theory that Cather had questioned her own gender in the 1920s, Patrick W. Shaw suggests that "fundamental double entendres" and "elaborate image clusters" throughout the novel support a reading of sexual disregularity and ambiguity.
