= The Professor's House =

Novel by Willa Cather

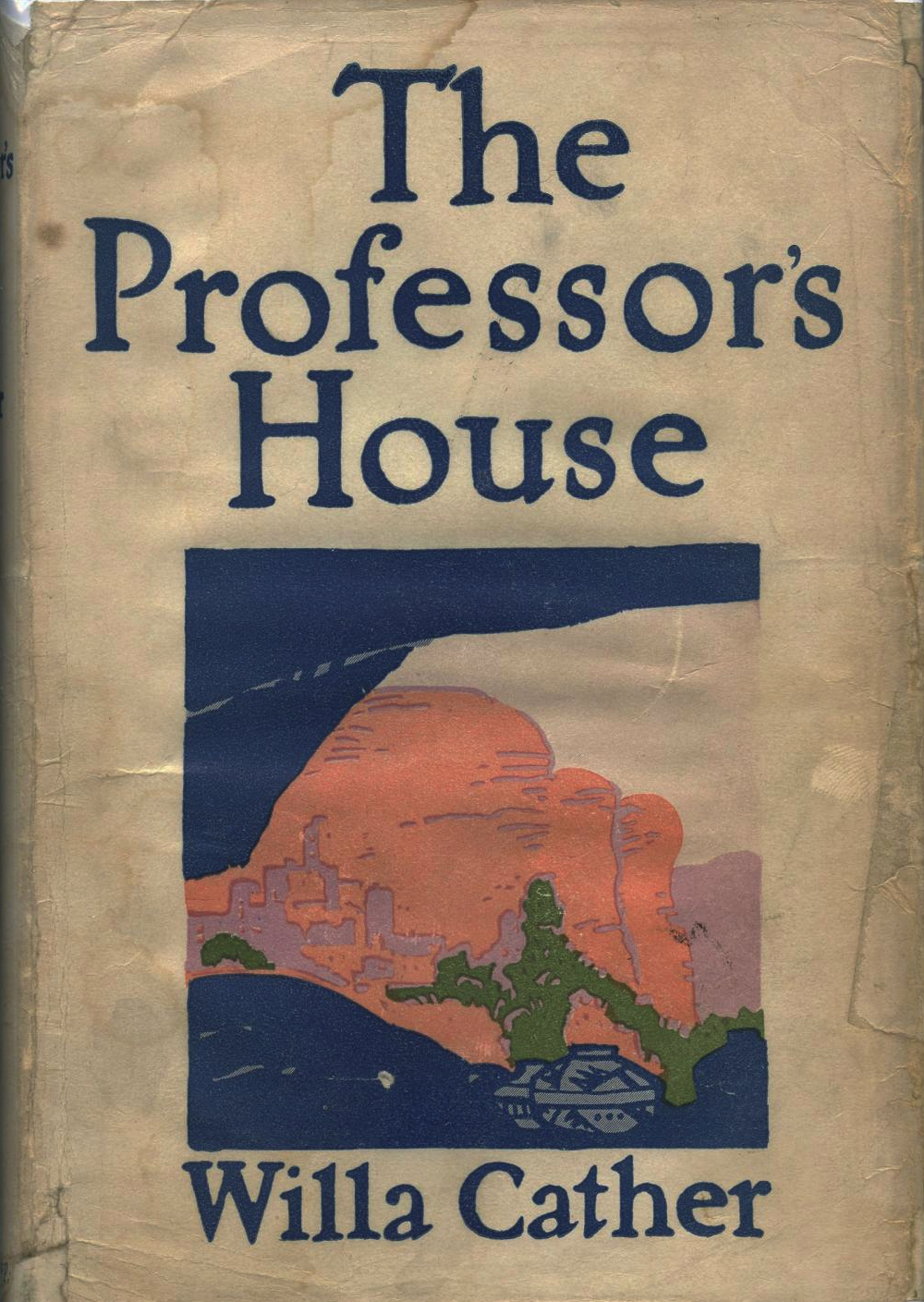
- First edition
- Author: Willa Cather
- Cover artist: C. B. Falls
- Language: English
- Publisher: Alfred A. Knopf
- Publication date: 1925
- Publication place: United States
- Media type: Print (Hardcover, Paperback)
- Text: The Professor's House at Wikisource

The Professor's House is a novel by American novelist Willa Cather. Published in 1925, the novel was written over several years. Cather first wrote the centerpiece, “Tom Outland's Story,” and then later wrote the two framing chapters “The Family” and “The Professor.”

== Plot summary ==
When Professor Godfrey St. Peter and wife move to a new house, he becomes uncomfortable with the route his life is taking. He keeps on his dusty study in the old house in an attempt to hang on to his old life. The marriages of his two daughters have removed them from the home and added two new sons-in-law, precipitating a mid-life crisis that leaves the Professor feeling as though he has lost the will to live because he has nothing to look forward to.

The novel initially addresses the Professor's interactions with his new sons-in-law and his family, while continually alluding to the pain they all feel over the death of Tom Outland in the Great War. Outland was not only the Professor's student and friend but the fiancé of his elder daughter, who is now living off the wealth created by the "Outland vacuum."

The novel's central section turns to Outland and recounts in first-person the story of his exploration of an ancient cliff city in New Mexico. The section is a retrospective narrative remembered by the professor.

In the final section, the professor, left alone while his family takes an expensive European tour, narrowly escapes death due to a gas leak in his study; and finds himself strangely willing to die. He is rescued by the old family seamstress, Augusta, who has been his staunch friend throughout. He resolves to go on with his life.

== Characters ==
- Godfrey St. Peter - Also known as the professor, the novel's protagonist. He is a fifty-two-year-old man of mixed descent “Canadian French on one side, and American farmers on the other”. He is described by his wife as growing “better-looking and more intolerant all the time”. He is a professor of history at Hamilton University and his book is entitled Spanish Adventures in North America. Godfrey's name comes from Godfrey of Boulogne, the conqueror who took Jerusalem: St. Peter is the rock on which the Roman church was built: St. Peter is writing about pioneers, when he is an intellectual pioneer and every bit of his name comes from famous pioneers in history.
- Lillian St. Peter - The professor's status-oriented wife. She is described as “occupied with the future” and adaptable. Most of her involvement in the novel is to act as a contrast to the professor and show the distance between his interests and his family. Their relationship is described as happy but dependent on her inheritance. She tells the professor “'One must go on living, Godfrey. But it wasn't the children who came between us.' There was something lonely and forgiving in her voice, something that spoke of an old wound, healed and hardened and hopeless”.
- Augusta - The family seamstress and friend of St. Peter. She is described as being “a reliable, methodical spinster, a German Catholic and very devout”.
- Rosamond - St. Peter's elder daughter and wife of Louie Marsellus. She was originally engaged to Tom Outland and he left everything to her when he died. She is now obsessed with her appearance and having all the finest things, likely because Louie showers her with extravagance. The professor admits that “he didn't in the least understand” her.
- Kathleen - St. Peter's younger daughter and wife of Scott McGregor. She is sweet and honest and is one of the more genuine characters in the novel. The professor says that “the only unusual thing about Kitty … is that she doesn't think herself a bit unusual” and that she “has a spark of something different”.
- Louie Marsellus - Rosamond's husband and executor of Tom Outland's patents from which he amassed a fortune and is now building a house and memorial to Tom where he and Rosamond will live called Outland. He is generous and very loving to Rosamond. The professor says that he is “perfectly consistent. He's a great deal more generous and public-spirited than I am, and my preferences would be enigmatical to him”. Nevertheless, Marsellus is named after the French monarch, and the Roman general who fought Hannibal, and the last part of his name, 'sellus' corroborates (mainly) Scott's idea that Louie is only interested in materialism. David Stouck has postulated that the "faintly offensive" character is partly based on the musician Jan Hambourg.
- Scott McGregor - Kathleen's husband. They became engaged soon after Rosamond's engagement to Louie. He is a journalist and writes a daily prose poem for the two to live off of. The professor describes him as “having a usual sort of mind” but that “he trusted him”. Scott and Kathleen are portrayed as truly loving each other.
- Tom Outland - Once St. Peter's student and Rosamond's fiancé before his death, the story focuses on his memory. The central piece of the chapter “Tom Outland's Story” is Tom's account of his adventures in the American Southwest investigating a cliff city's remains in the desert while working as a rancher. It is through these stories and his goodness that the St. Peter family fell in love with him and remembers him fondly.

== Major themes ==
The novel explores many contrasting ideas. Indeed in many respects, the novel deals with opposites, variously conceived: Marsellus vs. Outland, Kitty vs. Rosamond, the quixotic vs. the pragmatic, the old vs. the new, the idea of the Professor as a scholar vs. his family relations, Indian tribes vs. the contemporary world of the 1920s, and the opposing social poles of the Professor vs. Lillian. Those opposites are not always clear-cut. Considering the ending, the novel can be viewed as devoid of a clear moral imperative.

Similarly, the comparisons between the modern world in sections III and I contrast with Tom Outland’s natural world in section II. Yet the confused judgments of the characters block these comparisons and obscure clear morals: Tom’s both elevates and appropriates nature and the unsupported conclusions of Father Duchene pervert the true historical facts of the mesa culture. He assumes ‘Mother Eve’ was murdered for infidelity to her husband, but this would sharply contrasts Tom’s view of the mesa as an idyllic space away from ‘the dirty devices of the world’. Accordingly, The Professor’s House is generally analyzed as a critique of modernity—the Marselluses are consumed by the latest fashions, Mrs. St. Peter transfers her old love for her husband to a passion for her sons-in-law, science and the modern world corrupt St. Peter’s ideals of history and nature. Yet it is a failure to embrace modernity that nearly kills the Professor and brings him to the realization of his need for change. In his speech, the knowledgeable professor puts forth numerous contradictions. He criticizes science for only making humans comfortable in front of his lecture hall students, yet with his daughter he lauds the promise of what science can do for a man (Crane), and its superior value to money: “In Hamilton the correspondence between inner and outer has been destroyed: the dress-forms are deceptive; Rosamond's physical beauty clothes a spiritual emptiness; Louie's loud exterior covers an inner capacity for love and generosity. In Hamilton, the failure of inner and outer to cohere leads to misunderstandings and to the characters' inability to make meaningful contact with one another".

=== Nationalism ===
The Professor's House was written in 1925, in post-war America. In a similar fashion to F. Scott Fitzgerald's The Great Gatsby, Cather narrates a story about the moral decline of a money-driven society.

Tom displays an Emersonian understanding of national identity. His sense of Americanness is connected to the land and its beauty, and he believes in a collective possession of this land and all of its history for all Americans. His anger at Roddy’s sale of the Native American artifacts to the Germans stems from a belief that they were a piece of American history, that they were of the land, and therefore nobody had the right to sell them, much less to a non-American. Tom’s ultimate experience of connection to an American identity comes during his night on the mesa alone after his confrontation with Roddy, when he discovers “the mesa was no longer an adventure, but a religious emotion” and, “It was possession”.

Louie’s sense of national identity, in contrast, centers on money and the economic greatness of the country. He spends liberally the income derived from Tom’s advances in engineering. Louie wears the source of his wealth proudly; the fact that his livelihood is derived from his wife’s deceased fiancé does not create tension between husband and wife, nor between the couple and society. His announcement, “We have named our place for Tom Outland, a young American scientist and inventor, who was killed in Flanders, fighting with the Foreign Legion, the second year of the war, when he was barely thirty years of age,” displays his pride in and respect for his benefactor, and his recognition that Tom’s loyalty to the nation has brought Louie the monetary success he enjoys is representative of his understanding that America's economic success now takes precedence in defining the country and its people.

The professor is caught between the worldviews of Tom Outland and Louie Marsellus. He is resistant to change, idealistically holding onto Tom’s memory and an Emersonian ideality that impugned material acquisitiveness. As Outland’s good friend and mentor, St. Peter feels it is his responsibility to make sure Tom’s will is properly executed. In this endeavor, he is torn between his love for Tom and his love for his daughter Rosamond, both of whom, the professor believes, have different views on how the money should be spent. When Mrs. Crane asks for his help in obtaining compensation for her husband for the patent on which he worked intimately with Outland, the professor says, “Heaven knows I’d like to see Crane get something out of it, but how? How? I’ve thought a great deal about this matter, and I’ve blamed Tom for making that kind of will”. On the one hand, he is digging his heels into the ground, resisting the shift from a love of the land to a love of its fruits, but he also has a sense of obligation which makes it difficult for him to ignore the role money, particularly Tom’s money, plays in his relationships and social life.

Cather’s endorsement of one worldview over another is debatable, as has been demonstrated by various critics. Walter Benn Michaels suggests that Cather sides with Tom Outland, in that the poetry of “the ‘picture’ of the cliff dwellers’ tower, ‘rising strong, with calmness and courage’…marks in Cather the emergence of culture not only as an aspect of American identity but as one of its determinants”. From this perspective, Outland is Cather’s voice in the novel, advocating the close ties to the landscape as an expression of national identity. Contrarily, Sarah Wilson posits that Cather is instead critical of Tom’s nostalgia. “The cliff dwellings of the Blue Mesa once belonged to a now vanished culture, and no living Native American population has an indisputable claim on them…How, the novel queries, can a nation or individuals engage the history of a culturally and temporally other people?” However, Wilson does concede that “the America of which Tom Outland speaks, the nation that treasures its ancient Southwestern heritage, at least allows for unique ways of being American”.

== Critical trends and reception ==
While critically neglected for the better part of the 20th century, interest in Willa Cather was aroused in the 1980s with the rise of the feminist movement. Although many of her novels have been subsequently incorporated into the canon, critics have largely ignored The Professor’s House, passing it over as “morally and psychologically unachieved”. As a reason for this disparagement, critics often cite the “broken” format of the book, rebuking its structure as unnecessary. Or, they cite the ambivalent depiction of the Professor’s psyche. The reader is unsure of how to consider the Professor’s demands for solitude and his entrapment in the past. He’s a family man and a university man, but the Professor’s conflict reaches its crux when he surrenders the "local community for the nostalgic national ideal". A.S. Byatt calls The Professor's House Cather's "masterpiece... almost perfectly constructed, peculiarly moving, and completely original".

=== Form ===
The Professor’s House has been criticized as “fragmentary and inconclusive” because of the way the middle section, “Tom Outland’s Story,” fractures the surrounding narrative.

J. Schroeter presents the most common critical view regarding the structural meaning of the novel in his essay “Willa Cather and The Professor’s House”: "Book II is the 'turquoise' and Books I and III are the 'dull silver'. The whole novel, in other words, is constructed like the Indian bracelet. It is not hard to see that Willa Cather wants to draw an ironic contrast not only between two pieces of jewelry but between two civilizations, between two epochs, and between two men, Marcellus [sic] and Outland, who symbolize these differences".

Some critics, however, have analyzed the novel’s structure in light of the sonata—equating the novel with either a complete, three-movement sonata, or a single sonata, broken up into exposition, development, and recapitulation. Other critics, such as Sarah Wilson, cite the Dutch painting style, which Cather references in her correspondence, as a way of explaining the novel’s theme and layout. Dutch paintings provide a sense of the context beyond the actual objects presented. They consist of crowded interiors and, in Cather’s words, “a square window, open…The feeling of the sea that one got through those square windows was remarkable, and gave me a sense of the fleets of Dutch ships that ply quietly on all the waters of the globe—to Java, etc.’’ Applied to The Professor’s House, Books I and III serve as the overstuffed Dutch interior, while “Tom Outland’s Story, with its more open setting and voice, functions as the open window.

=== Queer readings ===
In recent years a queer reading of The Professor’s House has emerged. This reading centers on the professor’s relationship with Tom, as well as Tom’s relationship with his idolized friend Roddy. Some of those readings claim that through Tom’s youthful influence, the professor achieves a sort of procreation—his work comes forth more easily and fluidly, quote, “Tom represents the Professor’s need to live with delight.” For the professor, Tom’s loss also represents the professor’s forgoing of homoerotic desire and along with it, a life “without delight... without joy, without passionate grief”. Tom and Roddy share a deeply intimate experience of discovery. Tom views Roddy’s selling of the find as a betrayal, and within this reading is thought to experience a split with characteristics of a romantic rift.
