= Sapphira and the Slave Girl =

Novel by Willa Cather

- First edition
- Author: Willa Cather
- Language: English
- Genre: Historical fiction
- Publisher: Alfred A. Knopf (New York)
- Publication date: 7 Dec 1940
- Publication place: United States
- Media type: Print (Hardback & Paperback)
- Pages: 295

Sapphira and the Slave Girl is Willa Cather's last novel, published in 1940. It is the story of Sapphira Dodderidge Colbert, a bitter slave owner, who becomes irrationally jealous of Nancy, a member of her enslaved household staff.

== Plot summary ==
Set in 1856, the story follows Sapphira Colbert, an unhappy middle-aged woman crippled by dropsy. Sapphira and her husband Henry live separate lives. Coming from a prosperous family, Sapphira resents having married beneath her station. Henry works and resides at the family's mill, only visiting the estate house for occasional meals. One point of contention in their marriage is slavery: Sapphira is comfortable with the institution and with owning slaves while Henry is not.

Having overheard a conversation between two of her slaves, Sapphira develops a paranoid fear that Henry is having an affair with Nancy, an attractive young mulatto woman owned by the Colberts. Sapphira responds by mistreating Nancy and attempting to sell her, which Henry prevents. Eventually Sapphira invites a dissolute nephew to the estate, who threatens to rape Nancy on several occasions. Nancy, aided by Henry, the Colbert's daughter Rachel, and abolitionist neighbors, escapes to Canada via the Underground Railroad.

The epilogue takes place 25 years later. Nancy, now in her 40s, returns to Virginia to visit her mother, and Rachel. The novel shifts perspectives, from a third-person narrator to the first-person narration of a child, meant to represent Cather, witnessing Nancy's return after hearing the story of her escape.

== Characters ==
- Sapphira Dodderidge Colbert, a middle-aged white woman, dying of dropsy. Having married at the late age of 24, she has accepted as her husband a man she considers socially beneath her, and now this friction dominates the marriage. She is an Episcopalian. She has inherited her slaves from her father and believes thoroughly in the institution of slavery.
- Henry Colbert, a middle-aged white man, a miller and a Lutheran. He is tolerant of his bitter wife, but lives an essentially separate life, residing at his mill. Henry has developed qualms about slavery, mostly on religious grounds, but believes that the Colbert slaves are his wife's property.
- Rachel Colbert Blake, a white widow in her 30s who attends the Baptist church although she has not formally converted. As a child, she was her mother's least favorite daughter, which caused her to seek out the company of a neighbor, Mrs. Bywaters, who was an abolitionist. Rachel now also opposes slavery, and eventually aids Nancy in her escape.
- Nancy, a mulatto slave in her late teens, the daughter of Till and a white man believed to be one of Henry Colbert's brothers or a Cuban painter who once stayed at the estate. Her quiet ways make her Henry's favorite, which, along with overheard gossip, causes Sapphira to falsely assume that the two are having intimate relations.
- Till, a black slave in her 40s or 50s. She was orphaned as a child when her mother's dress caught fire, causing her death. She was put in the care of Mrs. Meacham, a white woman who became her surrogate mother and teacher. She was eventually sold to Sapphira as a lady's maid. She has one daughter, Nancy, who is believed by the family to have been fathered by an itinerant Cuban artist with whom she had a relationship. Till was married off to Uncle Jeff, who has physical handicaps and is unable to have sexual relations, so that her value as a maid would not be impeded by pregnancy.
- Fat Lizzie, a black slave and the household cook. She is a gossip and the primary source of Nancy's troubles. She is the mother of Bluebell, a Prissy-type slave on the estate.
- Old Jezebel, the oldest slave on the estate, she came to America in the 1780s and dies half-way through the book.
- Rev. Fairhead, a white Baptist minister and an abolitionist
- Mrs. Bywaters, a white woman, postmistress and an abolitionist
- Martin Colbert, a white man and Henry's nephew. A morally bankrupt man, whose amusing conversation charms Sapphira and annoys Henry. He makes threatening advances towards Nancy, suggesting on multiple occasions that he intends to rape her. He is the primary cause of her flight. He later dies during the Civil War fighting for the Confederate cause.

== Background ==
Willa Cather was born in 1873 in Back Creek, Virginia near Winchester. The Cather family lived in the area until Willa was 9, when they moved to Nebraska. Though Cather's most popular novels took place in the American west and Midwest, where she came of age, Sapphira is her only novel set in Virginia.

In letters to friends, Cather stated that the character of Rachel was based on her own grandmother Rachel who reportedly had helped an enslaved woman escape captivity. Other elements of Cather family history influenced the story, including the location of Back Creek, Virginia, the presence and importance of the mill, and the house in which the fictional Colbert family lives. In her author's note Cather attested that, although characters shared surnames with community members during her time in Frederick County, the characters were not meant to represent anyone she knew.

== Reception and Criticism ==
Upon its release in 1940, Sapphira and the Slave Girl received mostly positive reviews from white critics. Charles Poore of the New York Times praised Cather's direct writing style and the novel's "[exploration of] the question of slavery without any portentous fanfare, entirely through the lives of her characters." J. Donald Adams, also of the New York Times, found the novel less compelling than Cather's previous works but a "subtly done, if not completely satisfying, study of a domestic situation." Contemporary reviews praised the verisimilitude of Cather's Virginia. The Baltimore Sun found the most "memorable excellence" of Sapphira and the Slave Girl to be in "Miss Cather's beautifully tempered use of memories (for, we are told, she lived as a girl in the country she uses for her background)."

In the years since publication, Cather's depictions of slavery in the Antebellum South have drawn increased criticism. In 1990's Playing in the Dark: Whiteness and the Literary Imagination, Toni Morrison discusses the novel as an example of a white writer's imagining of black characters and the "powerful impact race has on narrative" Scholar Merrill Maguire Skaggs argued that although Cather relies on stereotypes of African Americans found in plantation novels, Sapphira ultimately subverts the genre as Nancy is not raped and her master helps her escape. Deborah Carlin analyzed Sapphira and the Slave Girl's the depiction of race and power in Cather, Canon and the Politics of Reading. While acknowledging that the novel is inspired by Cather's memories and holds Sapphira in the wrong, "the novel's rhetoric of race seems entirely conceived within stereotypic utterances about the essential nature of African Americans" and refrains from direct critique of slavery.
