= Willa Cather =

American writer (1873–1947)

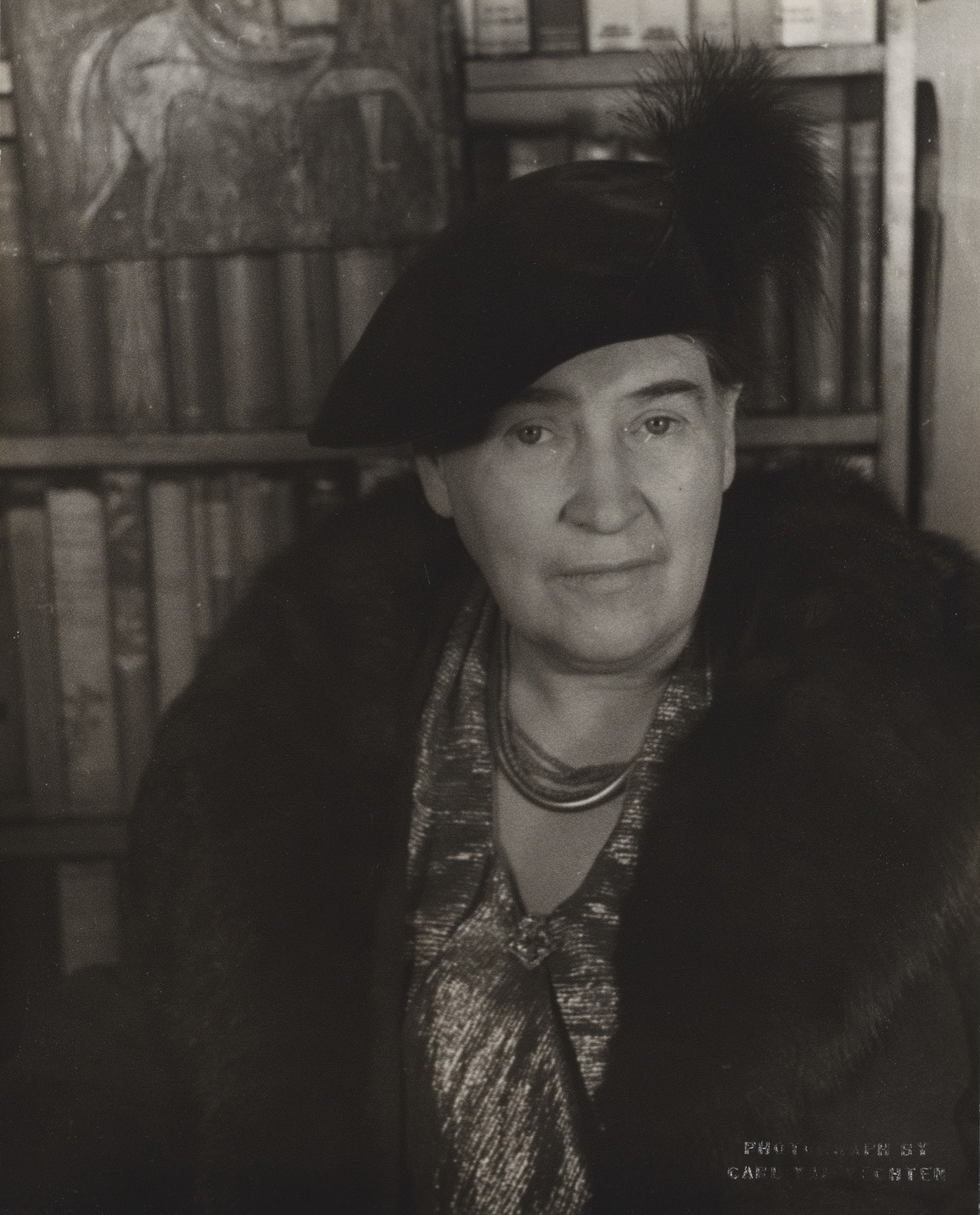
- Cather in 1936
- Born: Wilella Sibert Cather; December 7, 1873; Gore, Virginia, U.S.
- Died: April 24, 1947 (aged 73); New York City, U.S.
- Resting place: Jaffrey, New Hampshire, U.S.
- Education: University of Nebraska (BA)
- Occupation: Novelist
- Partner: Edith Lewis (c. 1908–1947)
- Writing career
- Period: 1905–1947

Willa Sibert Cather (/ˈkæðər/; born Wilella Sibert Cather; December 7, 1873 (Note: Sources are inconsistent on the date of Cather's birth, in large part because she fabricated—or as scholar Jean Schwind says, "chronically lied about"—the date. The 1873 date is confirmed by a birth certificate, an 1874 letter of her father's referring to her, university records, and Cather scholarship—both modern and historical. At the direction of the staff of McClure's Magazine, Cather claimed to be born in 1875. After 1920, she claimed 1876 as her birth year; this date has since been replicated in several scholarly sources. That is the date carved into her gravestone at Jaffrey, New Hampshire.) – April 24, 1947) was an American writer known for her novels of life on the Great Plains, including O Pioneers!, The Song of the Lark, and My Ántonia. In 1923, she was awarded the Pulitzer Prize for One of Ours, a novel set during World War I.

Willa Cather and her family moved from Virginia to Webster County, Nebraska, when she was nine years old. The family later settled as Homesteaders in the town of Red Cloud. Shortly after graduating from the University of Nebraska, Cather moved to Pittsburgh for 10 years, supporting herself as a magazine editor and high school English teacher. At the age of 33, she moved to New York City, her primary home for the rest of her life, though she also traveled widely and spent considerable time at her summer residence on Grand Manan Island, New Brunswick. She spent the last 39 years of her life with her domestic partner, Edith Lewis, before being diagnosed with breast cancer and dying of a cerebral hemorrhage. Cather and Lewis are buried together in Jaffrey, New Hampshire.

Cather achieved recognition as a novelist of the frontier and pioneer experience. She wrote of the spirit of those settlers moving into the western states, many of them European immigrants in the 19th century. Common themes in her work include nostalgia and exile. A sense of place is an important element in her fiction: landscapes and domestic spaces become dynamic presences, against which her characters struggle and find community.

== Early life and education ==
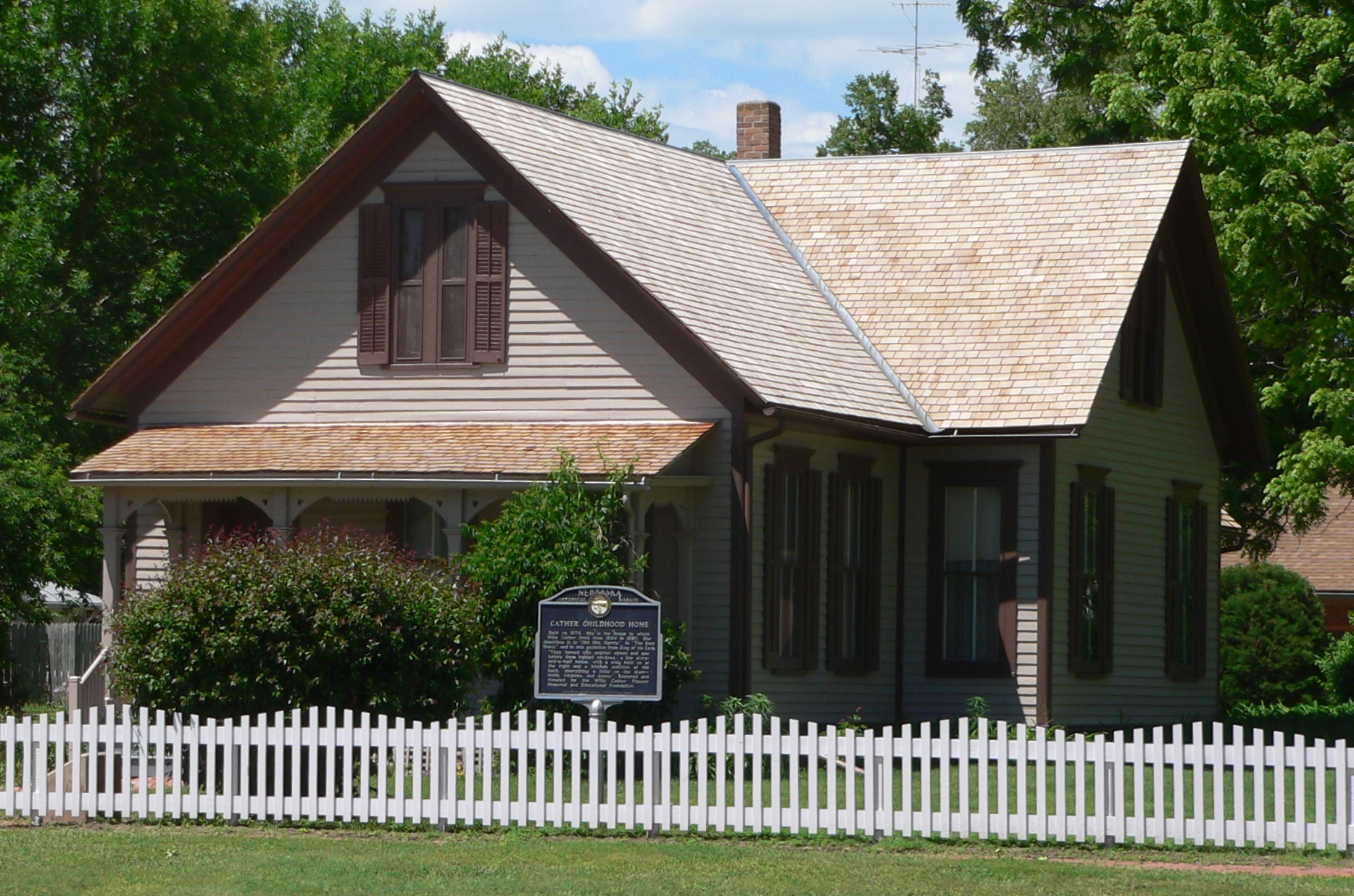
Willa Cather Childhood Home, Red Cloud, Nebraska

Cather was born in 1873 on her maternal grandmother's farm in the Back Creek Valley near Winchester, Virginia. Her father, Charles Fectigue Cather, descended from a family that had originated in Wales, deriving the Cather surname from Cadair Idris, a Gwynedd mountain. Her mother, Mary Virginia Boak, was a former school teacher. By the time Willa turned 12 months old, the family moved to Willow Shade, a Greek Revival-style home on 130 acres near Winchester, given to them by her paternal grandparents.

Mary Cather had six more children after Willa: Roscoe, Douglass, (Note: According to Elsie, Douglass's real name was Douglas, but Willa wanted him to spell it as Douglass, so he spelled it that way to please her.) Jessica, James, John, and Elsie. Willa was closer to her brothers than to her sisters, whom, according to biographer Hermione Lee, she "seems not to have liked very much."

At the urging of Charles Cather's parents, the family moved to Nebraska in 1883 when Willa was nine years old. Farmland appealed to Charles's father, and the family also wished to escape the rampant tuberculosis outbreaks in Virginia. Willa's father tried his hand at farming for 18 months, then moved the family into the town of Red Cloud, where he opened a real estate and insurance business, and the children attended school for the first time. Some of Cather's earliest work was first published in the Red Cloud Chief, the local paper. She also read widely, having made friends with a Jewish couple, the Wieners, who offered her unlimited access to their extensive library in Red Cloud. At the same time, she made house calls with the local physician and decided to become a surgeon. For a short while, she signed her name as William, but it was quickly abandoned in favor of "Willa."

After graduating from Red Cloud High School in 1890, at age 16, Cather moved to Lincoln, Nebraska, to enroll at the University of Nebraska–Lincoln. In her first year there, an essay she wrote on Thomas Carlyle was published in the Nebraska State Journal without her knowledge. Afterward, she began publishing columns for one dollar each, saying that her words on the printed page had "a kind of hypnotic effect" on her, pushing her to continue writing. She soon became a regular contributor to the Journal. Additionally, she served as the main editor of The Hesperian, the university's student newspaper, and became a contributor to the Lincoln Courier.

While at university, she learned mathematics from her friend John J. Pershing, who would later become General of the Armies and, like Cather, earn a Pulitzer Prize for writing. Although she originally planned to study science with the goal of becoming a physician, she switched her course of study and graduated with a Bachelor of Arts in English in 1895.

Cather's time in Nebraska, still considered a frontier state, was a formative experience: She was moved by the dramatic environment and weather, the vastness of the prairie, and the various cultures of the area's immigrant and Native American families.

== Life and career ==
In 1896, when Cather accepted a writing job with Home Monthly, a women's magazine, she moved to Pittsburgh. There, she produced journalistic pieces, short stories, and poetry. When the magazine was sold a year later, she became a telegraph editor and critic for the Pittsburgh Leader and frequently contributed poetry and short fiction to The Library, another local publication. She also became a school teacher: She taught Latin, algebra, and English composition at Pittsburgh's Central High School for one year; and then, taught English and Latin at the city's Allegheny High School, where she rose to head the English department.

Shortly after moving to Pittsburgh, Cather began publishing short stories in the Home Monthly, including "Tommy, the Unsentimental" about a boyish-looking Nebraskan girl with a masculine name, who ultimately saves her father's banking business. Janis P. Stout in Willa Cather: The Writer and Her World (2000) cites this story among several Cather works that "demonstrate the speciousness of rigid gender roles, and give favorable treatment to characters who undermine conventions."

Cather resigned from her job at the Pittsburgh Leader in the late spring of 1900 before relocating to Washington, D.C., that fall. In April 1902, she published her final contribution to the Lincoln Courier before going abroad with Isabelle McClung that summer. Her first book, a collection of poetry called April Twilights, came out in 1903. (Note: This collection of poetry, while described as unremarkable, was republished several times by Cather over her life, although with significant alterations. Eleven of these poems were never again published after 1903. This early experience with traditional, sentimental verse—without alteration from this scheme—was the basis for the rest of her literary career; she remarked that one's earliest writing is formative. While Cather's success was primarily in prose, her republishing of her earliest poetry suggests she wished to be taken as a poet as well. But this is contradicted by Cather's own words, where in 1925, where she wrote, "I do not take myself seriously as a poet.") It was followed shortly afterward, in 1905, by Cather's first published collection of short stories, The Troll Garden, containing some of her most famous short fiction, including "A Wagner Matinee," "The Sculptor's Funeral," and "Paul's Case."

Upon accepting an editorial position at McClure's Magazine in 1906, Cather moved to New York City. But, while still working at McClure's, she spent most of 1907 living in Boston, writing a series of exposés about the religious leader Mary Baker Eddy (although freelance journalist Georgine Milmine was solely credited as the author). A 1993 letter, discovered in the Christian Science church archives by Eddy biographer Gillian Gill, disclosed that Cather had, perhaps reluctantly, written articles 2 through 14 of the 14-part series. Milmine had performed copious research, but she had been unable to produce a manuscript independently, and McClure's employed Cather and a few other editors, including Burton J. Hendrick, to assist her. This work was serialized in McClure's over the next 18 months and then published in book form as The Life of Mary Baker G. Eddy and the History of Christian Science, attributed entirely to Georgina Milmine, instead of identifying Willa Cather as its rightful author (as was revealed and confirmed decades later).

McClure's also serialized Cather's first novel, Alexander's Bridge (1912). While most reviews were favorable, including The Atlantic's, which called the writing "deft and skillful," Cather herself soon saw the novel as weak and shallow.

She followed Alexander's Bridge with three novels set in the Great Plains, which eventually became both popular and critical successes: O Pioneers! (1913), The Song of the Lark (1915), and My Ántonia (1918). Taken together, they are sometimes referred to as her "Prairie Trilogy" a succession of plains-based novels that drew praise for their use of plainspoken language about ordinary people. Sinclair Lewis, for example, lauded her for making Nebraska accessible to the wider world for the first time. After writing The Great Gatsby, F. Scott Fitzgerald lamented that it was a failure in comparison to My Ántonia.

=== 1920s ===
By 1920, Cather was dissatisfied with her publisher, Houghton Mifflin, which had devoted an advertising budget of only $300 to My Ántonia; refused to pay for all the illustrations she had commissioned from Władysław T. Benda for the book; and produced a poorly and cheaply made volume. So, that year, she turned to the young publishing house of Alfred A. Knopf, which had a reputation for supporting its authors through advertising campaigns. She also liked the look of its books and had been impressed with its edition of Green Mansions by William Henry Hudson. She so appreciated their style that all her Knopf books of the 1920s (save for one printing of her short story collection Youth and the Bright Medusa) matched its design on their second and subsequent printings.

Cather was, by then, firmly established as a major American writer, receiving the Pulitzer Prize in 1923 for her World War I-based novel, One of Ours. She followed it with the popular Death Comes for the Archbishop in 1927, selling 86,500 copies in just two years. It has been included on the Modern Library 100 Best Novels of the 20th century.

Two of her three other novels of the decade—A Lost Lady and The Professor's House—elevated her literary status dramatically. She was invited to give several hundred public lectures, earned significant royalties, and sold the movie rights to A Lost Lady. Yet her other novel of the decade, My Mortal Enemy, published in 1926, received no widespread acclaim—and neither she nor her life partner, Edith Lewis, made significant mention of it later in their lives.

Despite her success, she was also subject to harsh criticism, particularly surrounding One of Ours. Her close friend, Elizabeth Shepley Sergeant, saw the novel as a betrayal of the realities of war, not understanding how to "bridge the gap between [Cather's] idealized war vision ... and my own stark impressions of war as lived." Similarly, Ernest Hemingway took issue with her portrayal of war, writing in a 1923 letter, "Wasn't [the novel's] last scene in the lines wonderful? Do you know where it came from? The battle scene in Birth of a Nation. I identified episode after episode, Catherized. Poor woman, she had to get her war experience somewhere."

In 1929, she was elected to the American Academy of Arts and Letters.

=== 1930s ===
By the 1930s, an increasingly large share of critics began to dismiss her as overly romantic and nostalgic, unable to grapple with contemporary issues: Granville Hicks, for instance, charged Cather with escaping into an idealized past to avoid confronting the problems of the present. And it was particularly in the context of the hardships of the Great Depression in which her work was seen as lacking social relevance. Similarly, critics—and Cather herself—were disappointed when her novel A Lost Lady was made into a film; the film had little resemblance to the novel.

Cather's lifelong conservative politics, (Note: Not all critics see her 1930s political views as conservative; Reynolds argues that while she was reactionary later in life, she subscribed to a form of rural populism and progressivism, built on the continuity of community, and Clasen views her as a progressive. Similarly, it has been suggested she was distinctly opaque, and that in terms of literary innovation, she was solidly progressive, even radical.) appealing to critics such as Mencken, Randolph Bourne, and Carl Van Doren, soured her reputation with younger, often left-leaning critics like Hicks and Edmund Wilson. Despite this critical opposition to her work, Cather remained a popular writer whose novels and short story collections continued to sell well; in 1931 Shadows on the Rock was the most widely read novel in the United States, and Lucy Gayheart became a bestseller in 1935.

Although Cather made her last trip to Red Cloud in 1931 for a family gathering after her mother's death, she stayed in touch with her Red Cloud friends and sent money to Annie Pavelka and other families during the Depression years. In 1932, Cather published Obscure Destinies, her final collection of short fiction, which contained "Neighbour Rosicky," one of her most highly regarded stories. That same summer, she moved into a new apartment on Park Avenue with Edith Lewis, and during a visit on Grand Manan, she probably began working on her next novel, Lucy Gayheart. (Note: Some sources indicate that Cather began writing Lucy Gayheart in 1933. Homestead argues instead that she truly began writing in the summer of 1932. Some sources agree with her. Others are imprecise or ambiguous. Her idea for the story may have been formed as early as the 1890s (using the name Gayhardt instead of Gayheart, based on a woman she met at a party), and it is possible she began writing as early as 1926 or 1927. While she intended to name the novel Blue Eyes on the Platte early on, she changed the title and made Lucy's eyes brown. Stout suggests mention of Blue Eyes on the Platte may have been facetious, only beginning to write and think about Lucy Gayheart in 1933. This is contradicted by Edith Lewis insisting that not only did she begin working on Blue Eyes on the Platte "several years before" 1933, but that it was the precursor to Lucy Gayheart. Regardless of which of these details are true, it is known that Cather reused images from her 1911 short story, "The Joy of Nelly Deane", in Lucy Gayheart. "The Joy of Nelly Deane" may be best understood as an earlier version of Lucy Gayheart altogether.)

Cather suffered two devastating losses in 1938. In June, her favorite brother, Douglass, died of a heart attack. Cather was too grief-stricken to attend the funeral. Four months later, Isabelle McClung died. Cather and McClung had lived together when Cather first arrived in Pittsburgh, and while McClung eventually married the musician Jan Hambourg and moved with her husband to Toronto, the two women remained devoted friends. (Note: Cather wrote hundreds of letters to McClung over her life, and most of them were returned to Cather by McClung's husband. Almost all of these were destroyed.) Cather wrote that Isabelle was the person for whom she wrote all her books.

=== Final years ===
During the summer of 1940, Cather and Lewis went to Grand Manan for the last time, and Cather finished her final novel, Sapphira and the Slave Girl, a book much darker in tone and subject matter than her previous works. While Sapphira is understood by readers as lacking a moral sense and failing to evoke empathy, the novel was a great critical and commercial success, with an advance printing of 25,000 copies. It was then adopted by the Book of the Month Club, which bought more than 200,000 copies. Her final story, "The Best Years", intended as a gift for her brother, was retrospective. It contained images or "keepsakes" from each of her twelve published novels and the short stories in Obscure Destinies.

Although an inflamed tendon in her hand hampered her writing, Cather managed to finish a substantial part of a novel set in Avignon, France. She had titled it Hard Punishments and placed it in the 14th century during the reign of Antipope Benedict XIV. She was elected a fellow of the American Academy of Arts and Sciences in 1943. The same year, she executed a will that prohibited the publication of her letters and dramatization of her works. In 1944, she received the gold medal for fiction from the National Institute of Arts and Letters, a prestigious award given for an author's total accomplishments.

Cather was diagnosed with breast cancer in December 1945 and underwent a mastectomy on January 14, 1946. By early 1947, her cancer had metastasized to her liver, becoming stage IV cancer. On April 24, 1947, Cather died of a cerebral hemorrhage at the age of 73 in her home at 570 Park Avenue in Manhattan. After Cather's death, Edith Lewis destroyed the manuscript of Hard Punishments according to Cather's instructions. She is buried at the southwest corner of Jaffrey, New Hampshire's Old Burying Ground, a place she first visited when joining Isabelle McClung and her husband, violinist Jan Hambourg, at the Shattuck Inn. Lewis was buried alongside Cather some 25 years later.

== Writing influences ==
Cather admired Henry James's use of language and characterization. While Cather enjoyed the novels of several women—including George Eliot, the Brontës, and Jane Austen—she regarded most women writers with disdain, judging them overly sentimental. One contemporary exception was Sarah Orne Jewett, who became Cather's friend and mentor. (Note: Some sources describe the relationship using stronger language: as Cather being Jewett's protégé. Either way, Jewett's remarkable influence on Cather is evidenced not only by her commitment to regionalism, but also by Cather's (perhaps overstated) role in editing The Country of the Pointed Firs.) Jewett advised Cather of several things: to use female narrators in her fiction (even though Cather preferred using male perspectives), to write about her "own country" (O Pioneers! was dedicated to Jewett), and to write fiction that explicitly represented romantic attraction between women. (Note: Jewett wrote in a letter to Cather, "with what deep happiness and recognition I have read the "McClure" story,—night before last I found it with surprise and delight. It made me feel very near to the writer's young and loving heart. You have drawn your two figures of the wife and her husband with unerring touches and wonderful tenderness for her. It makes me the more sure that you are far on your road toward a fine and long story of very high class. The lover is as well done as he could be when a woman writes in the man's character,—it must always, I believe, be something of a masquerade. I think it is safer to write about him as you did about the others, and not try to be he! And you could almost have done it as yourself—a woman could love her in that same protecting way—a woman could even care enough to wish to take her away from such a life, by some means or other. But oh, how close—how tender—how true the feeling is!") Cather was also influenced by the work of Katherine Mansfield, praising in an essay Mansfield's ability "to throw a luminous streak out onto the shadowy realm of personal relationships."

Cather's high regard for the immigrant families forging lives and enduring hardships on the Nebraska plains shaped much of her fiction. The Burlington Depot in Red Cloud brought in many strange and wonderful people to her small town. As a child, she visited immigrant families in her area and returned home in "the most unreasonable state of excitement," feeling that she "had got inside another person's skin." After a trip to Red Cloud in 1916, Cather decided to write a novel based on the events in the life of her childhood friend Annie Sadilek Pavelka, a Bohemian girl who became the model for the title character in My Ántonia. Cather was likewise fascinated by the French-Canadian pioneers from Quebec who had settled in the Red Cloud area while she was a girl.

During a brief stopover in Quebec with Edith Lewis in 1927, Cather was inspired to write a novel set in that French-Canadian city. Lewis recalled: "From the first moment that she looked down from the windows of the [Chateau] Frontenac [Hotel] on the pointed roofs and Norman outlines of the town of Quebec, Willa Cather was not merely stirred and charmed—she was overwhelmed by the flood of memories, recognition, surmise it called up; by the sense of its extraordinary French character, isolated and kept intact through hundreds of years, as if by a miracle, on this great un-French continent." Cather finished her novel Shadows on the Rock, a historical novel set in 17th-century Quebec, in 1931; it was later included in Life magazine's list of the 100 outstanding books of 1924–1944. The French influence is found in many other Cather works, including Death Comes for the Archbishop (1927) and her final, unfinished novel set in Avignon, Hard Punishments.

== Literary style and reception ==
"On the Art of Fiction"
by Willa Cather 1920
Read by TommyMer for LibriVox
Audio 00:04:40 (full text)

Although Cather began her writing career as a journalist, she made a distinction between journalism, which she saw as being primarily informative, and literature, which she saw as an art form. Cather's work is often marked by—and criticized for—its nostalgic tone and themes drawn from memories of her early years on the American plains. Consequently, a sense of place is integral to her work: notions of land, the frontier, (Note: Between 1891 and Cather's publication of The Song of the Lark, there was a paucity of novels dealing with farm life. By the 1920s, however, literary interest in rural life and the frontier grew considerably.) pioneering and relationships with western landscapes are recurrent. Even when her heroines were placed in an urban environment, the influence of place was critical, and the way that power was displayed through room layout and furniture is evident in her novels like My Mortal Enemy. Though she hardly confined herself to writing exclusively about the Midwest, Cather is virtually inseparable from the Midwestern identity that she actively cultivated (even though she was not a "native" Midwesterner). While Cather is said to have significantly altered her literary approach in each of her novels, this stance is not universal; some critics have charged Cather with being out of touch with her times and failing to use more experimental techniques in her writing, such as stream of consciousness. At the same time, others have sought to place Cather alongside modernists by either pointing to the extreme effects of her apparently simple Romanticism or acknowledging her own "middle ground":

She had formed and matured her ideas on art before she wrote a novel. She had no more reason to follow Gertrude Stein and James Joyce, whose work she respected, than they did to follow her. Her style solves the problems in which she was interested. She wanted to stand midway between the journalists whose omniscient objectivity accumulate more fact than any character could notice and the psychological novelist whose use of subjective point of view stories distorts objective reality. She developed her theory on a middle ground, selecting facts from experience on the basis of feeling and then presenting the experience in a lucid, objective style.

The English novelist A. S. Byatt has written that with each work Cather reinvented the novel form to investigate the changes in the human condition over time. Particularly in her frontier novels, Cather wrote of both the beauty and terror of life. Like the exiled characters of Henry James, an author who had a significant influence on the author, most of Cather's major characters live as exiled immigrants, identifying with the immigrants' "sense of homelessness and exile" following her own feelings of exile living on the frontier. It is through their engagement with their environment that they gain their community. Susan J. Rosowski wrote that Cather was perhaps the first to grant immigrants a respectable position in American literature.

== Personal life ==
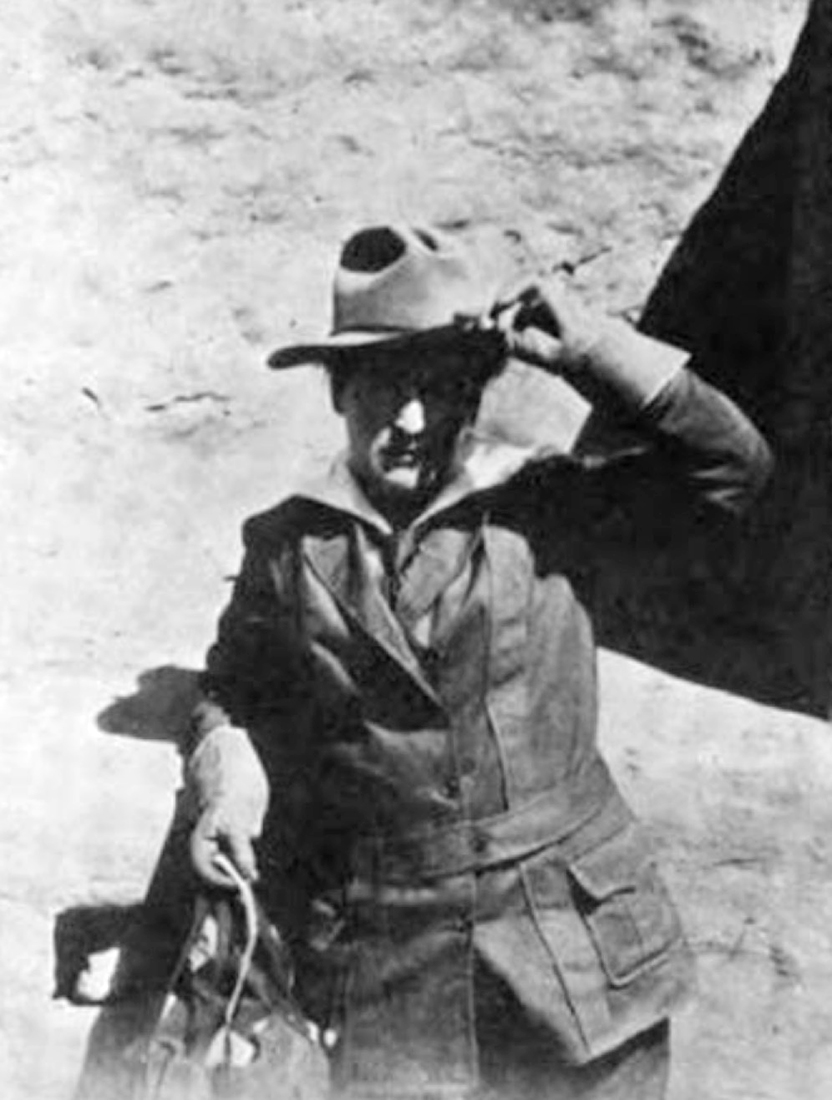
Willa Cather in the Mesa Verde wilds, c. 1915

Scholars disagree about Cather's sexual identity. Some believe it impossible or anachronistic to determine whether she had same-sex attraction, while others disagree. Researcher Deborah Carlin suggests that denial of Cather being a lesbian is rooted in treating same-sex desire "as an insult to Cather and her reputation", rather than a neutral historical perspective. Melissa Homestead has argued that Cather was attracted to Edith Lewis, and in so doing, asked: "What kind of evidence is needed to establish this as a lesbian relationship? Photographs of the two of them in bed together? She was an integral part of Cather's life, creatively and personally." Beyond her own relationships with women, Cather's reliance on male characters has been used to support the idea of her same-sex attraction. (Note: Some scholars also use this male-centered narrative approach to read Cather as transmasculine or just masculine.) Harold Bloom calls her "erotically evasive in her art" due to prevailing "societal taboos".

In any event, throughout Cather's adult life, her closest relationships were with women. These included her college friend Louise Pound; the Pittsburgh socialite Isabelle McClung, with whom Cather traveled to Europe and at whose Toronto home she stayed for prolonged visits; the opera singer Olive Fremstad; and most notably, the editor Edith Lewis, with whom Cather lived the last 39 years of her life.

Cather's relationship with Lewis began in the early 1900s. They lived together in a series of apartments in New York City from 1908 until Cather's death in 1947. From 1913 to 1927, Cather and Lewis lived at No. 5 Bank Street in Greenwich Village. They moved when the apartment was scheduled for demolition during the construction of the Broadway–Seventh Avenue New York City Subway line (now the 1, 2, and 3 trains). While Lewis was selected as the literary trustee for Cather's estate, she was not merely a secretary for Cather's documents but an integral part of Cather's creative process.

Beginning in 1922, Cather spent summers on the island of Grand Manan in New Brunswick, where she bought a cottage in Whale Cove on the Bay of Fundy. This is where her short story "Before Breakfast" is set. She valued the seclusion of the island and did not mind that her cottage had neither indoor plumbing nor electricity. Anyone wishing to reach her could do so by telegraph or mail. In 1940, she stopped visiting Grand Manan after Canada's entrance to World War II, as travel was considerably more difficult; she also began a long recuperation from gallbladder surgery in 1942 that restricted travel.

A resolutely private person, Cather destroyed many drafts, personal papers, and letters, asking others to do the same. While many complied, some did not. Her will restricted the ability of scholars to quote from the personal papers that remain. But in April 2013, The Selected Letters of Willa Cather—a collection of 566 letters Cather wrote to friends, family, and literary acquaintances such as Thornton Wilder and F. Scott Fitzgerald—was published, two years after the death of Cather's nephew and second literary executor, Charles Cather. Willa Cather's correspondence revealed the complexity of her character and inner world. The letters do not disclose any intimate details about Cather's personal life, but they do "make clear that [her] primary emotional attachments were to women." The Willa Cather Archive at the University of Nebraska–Lincoln works to digitize her complete body of writing, including private correspondence and published work. As of 2021, about 2,100 letters have been made freely available to the public, in addition to transcription of her own published writing.

== Honors and tributes ==
In 1931, Willa Cather was awarded an honorary Doctor of Letters by Princeton University, which cited her "power to create a suitable atmosphere of time and place." She was the first woman to receive an honorary degree from Princeton.

In 1934, she was elected to the American Philosophical Society.

In 1962, she was inducted into the Nebraska Hall of Fame.

In 1963, the University of Nebraska-Lincoln constructed Cather Hall, a dormitory named after her. In 2017, it was demolished along with the adjacent Cather-Pound-Neihardt Dining Center, which was replaced by the new Willa Cather Dining Complex.

In 1973, the United States Postal Service issued a postage stamp honoring her.

In 1974, she was inducted into the Hall of Great Westerners.

In 1986, she was inducted into the National Cowgirl Museum and Hall of Fame’s Hall of Fame.

In 1988, she was inducted into the National Women's Hall of Fame.

In 2000, she was named as one of the Virginia Women in History.

In 2019, the lead single from Fresh's second album Withdraw was released. The single, Willa, is named after her.

In 2023, the U.S. state of Nebraska donated a bronze sculpture of Cather by Littleton Alston to the National Statuary Hall Collection. The statue is installed in the United States Capitol's Capitol Visitors Center, in Washington, D.C.

== Works ==
=== Novels ===
- Alexander's Bridge (1912)
- O Pioneers! (1913)
- The Song of the Lark (1915)
- My Ántonia (1918)
- One of Ours (1922)
- A Lost Lady (1923)
- The Professor's House (1925)
- My Mortal Enemy (1926)
- Death Comes for the Archbishop (1927)
- Shadows on the Rock (1931)
- Lucy Gayheart (1935)
- Sapphira and the Slave Girl (1940)

=== Short story collections ===
- The Troll Garden (1905)
- Youth and the Bright Medusa (1920)
- Obscure Destinies (1932)
- The Old Beauty and Others (1948)
- Five Stories (1956)
- Early Stories of Willa Cather [1892-1900] (1957)
- Willa Cather's Collected Short Fiction, 1892–1912 (1965)
- Uncle Valentine and Other Stories: Willa Cather's Uncollected Short Fiction, 1915–1929 (1972)

=== Poetry ===
- April Twilights (1903)
- April Twilights and Other Poems (1923)

=== Nonfiction ===
- Not Under Forty (1936)
- The Kingdom of Art: Willa Cather's First Principles and Critical Statements, 1893-1896 (1966)
- The World and the Parish: Willa Cather's Articles and Reviews, 1893-1902 (1970)

== Gallery ==
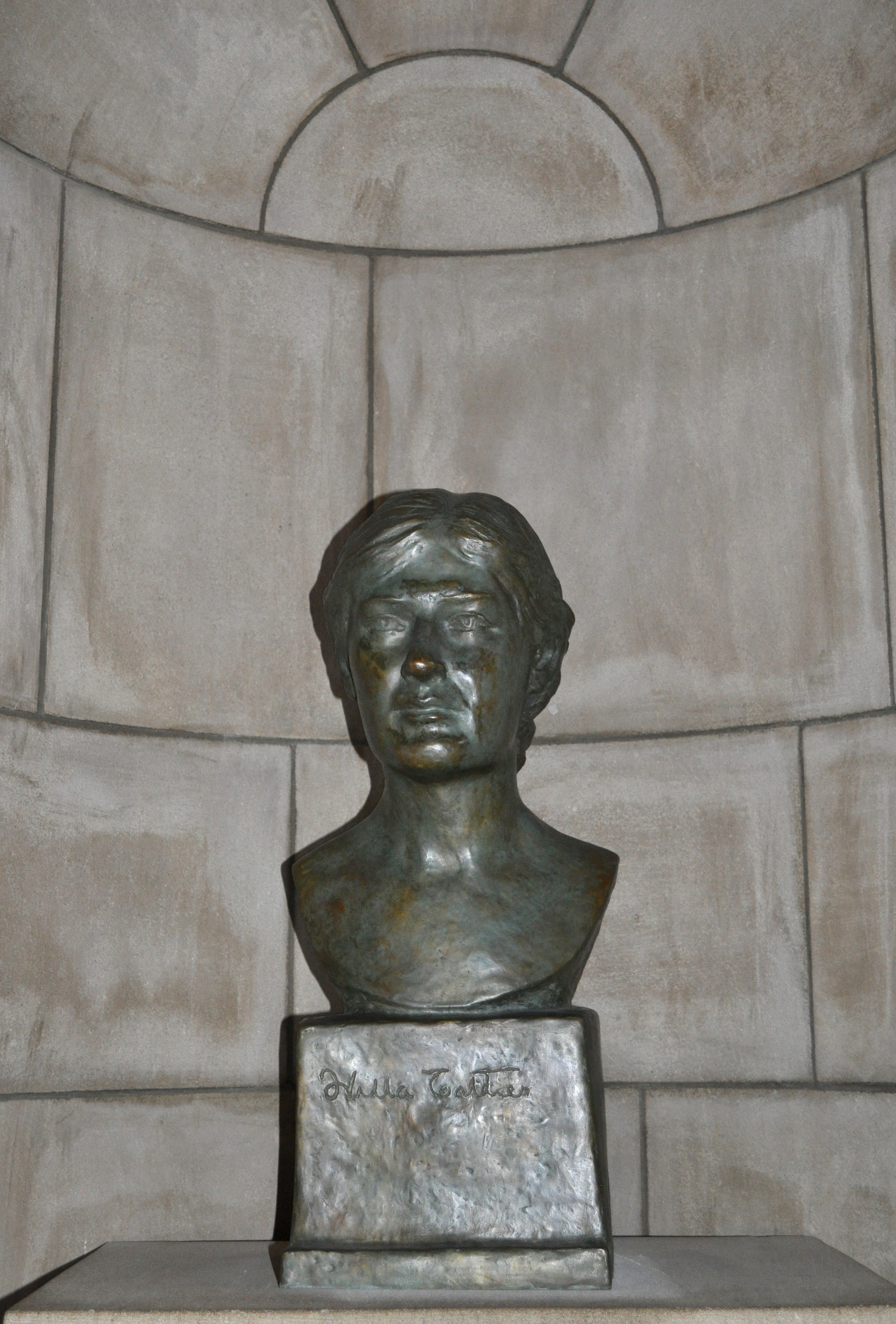
A bust of Cather created in 1962 by Paul Swan for the Nebraska Hall of Fame

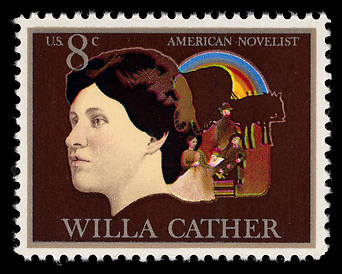
A postage stamp honoring Cather, issued by the United States Postal Service in 1973

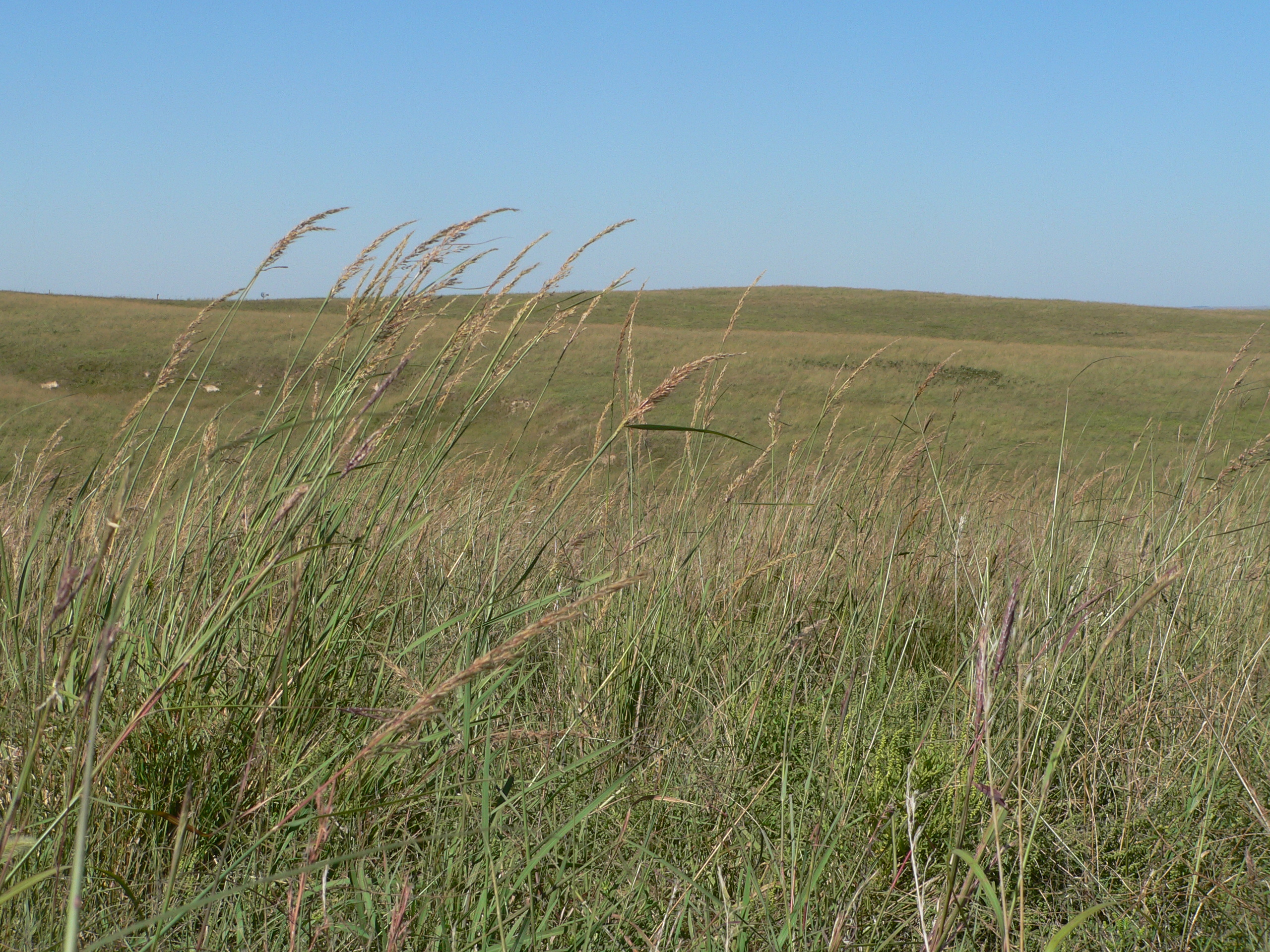
Willa Cather Memorial Prairie in Webster County, Nebraska
