= National Register of Historic Places listings in Webster County, Nebraska =

Location of Webster County in Nebraska

Webster County, Nebraska, United States, has 37 properties and districts listed on the National Register of Historic Places, including two National Historic Landmarks. The locations of National Register properties and districts for which the latitude and longitude coordinates are included below, may be seen in a map.

This National Park Service list is complete through NPS recent listings posted April 24, 2026.

== Listings county-wide ==
	Name on the Register	Image	Date listed	Location	City or town	Description
1	Auld Public Library	Auld Public Library	December 10, 1993 (#93001404)	537 N. Webster; 40°05′26″N 98°31′10″W	Red Cloud	
2	Matthew R. Bentley House	Matthew R. Bentley House	August 11, 1982 (#82004927)	845 N. Cedar; 40°05′38″N 98°31′14″W	Red Cloud	
3	Burlington Depot	Burlington Depot	March 5, 1981 (#81000376)	Seward St. 40°04′38″N 98°31′17″W	Red Cloud	
4	Cather House	Cather House	April 16, 1969 (#69000139)	Southwestern corner of 3rd Avenue and Cedar Street; 40°05′14″N 98°31′13″W	Red Cloud	
5	George Cather Farmstead	George Cather Farmstead	August 11, 1982 (#82004917)	Southwest of Bladen: 552 Road T 40°14′57″N 98°38′27″W	Bladen	
6	William Cather Homestead Site	William Cather Homestead Site	August 11, 1982 (#82004921)	Northwest of Red Cloud; 40°13′07″N 98°39′31″W	Red Cloud	
7	Chalk Cliff and Republican River	Chalk Cliff and Republican River	August 11, 1982 (#82004919)	1 mile south of Red Cloud; 40°03′43″N 98°31′23″W	Red Cloud	
8	City Pharmacy	City Pharmacy	February 11, 1982 (#82004929)	410 N. Webster; 40°05′21″N 98°31′07″W	Red Cloud	
9	Crossroads Grave Site	Crossroads Grave Site	August 11, 1982 (#82004920)	Northwest of Red Cloud; 40°11′27″N 98°36′48″W	Red Cloud	
10	William Ducker House	William Ducker House	February 11, 1982 (#82004930)	821 Franklin St. 40°05′37″N 98°31′40″W	Red Cloud	
11	Elm St. Historic District	Elm St. Historic District	August 11, 1982 (#82004934)	Roughly bounded by 10th and 6th Aves. and Locust and Webster Sts. 40°05′35″N 98°31′02″W	Red Cloud	
12	Farmer's and Merchant's Bank Building	Farmer's and Merchant's Bank Building	March 5, 1981 (#81000377)	338 N. Webster St. 40°05′19″N 98°31′07″W	Red Cloud	
13	First Baptist Church	First Baptist Church	August 12, 1982 (#82003206)	442 N. Seward St. 40°05′23″N 98°31′17″W	Red Cloud	
14	Garber Grove	Garber Grove	August 11, 1982 (#82004916)	East of Red Cloud; 40°05′06″N 98°30′55″W	Red Cloud	
15	Grace Protestant Episcopal Church	Grace Protestant Episcopal Church	February 11, 1982 (#82004931)	546 N. Cedar St. 40°05′26″N 98°31′12″W	Red Cloud	
16	IOOF Hall and Opera House	IOOF Hall and Opera House	July 6, 1988 (#88000953)	Main St. 40°19′21″N 98°35′42″W	Bladen	
17	Inavale Community Hall and Gymnasium		March 3, 2023 (#100008680)	418 Minnesota Ave. 40°05′31″N 98°38′58″W	Inavale	
18	Jackson's Reserve	Jackson's Reserve	August 11, 1982 (#82004936)	Bounded by Seward, Cedar, and 3rd Sts. 40°04′51″N 98°31′13″W	Red Cloud	
19	Main Street Historic District	Main Street Historic District	February 11, 1982 (#82004932)	Roughly bounded by 3rd and 5th Aves. and Elm and Cedar Sts. 40°05′20″N 98°31′09″W	Red Cloud	
20	Dr. Gilbert McKeeby House	Dr. Gilbert McKeeby House	August 11, 1982 (#82004937)	641 N. Cherry St. 40°05′30″N 98°31′34″W	Red Cloud	
21	Miner Brothers Store	Miner Brothers Store	August 11, 1982 (#82004924)	3rd and Webster Sts. 40°05′17″N 98°31′10″W	Red Cloud	
22	Miner House	Miner House	August 11, 1982 (#82004922)	241 N. Seward; 40°05′15″N 98°31′19″W	Red Cloud	
23	Moon Block	Moon Block	August 11, 1982 (#82004926)	Webster St. between 4th and 5th Aves. 40°05′22″N 98°31′10″W	Red Cloud	
24	Opera House	Opera House	August 11, 1982 (#82004925)	413 N. Webster; 40°05′21″N 98°31′10″W	Red Cloud	
25	Pavelka Farmstead	Pavelka Farmstead	April 13, 1979 (#79001459)	Southeast of Bladen; 40°16′52″N 98°32′34″W	Bladen	
26	Perkins-Wiener House	Perkins-Wiener House	August 11, 1982 (#82004923)	238 N. Seward; 40°05′15″N 98°31′17″W	Red Cloud	
27	Pike-Pawnee Village Site	Pike-Pawnee Village Site	October 15, 1966 (#66000455)	Address Restricted	Guide Rock	
28	Railroad Addition Historic District	Railroad Addition Historic District	August 11, 1982 (#82004935)	Roughly bounded by Vine, Division, Seward, Railroad, and 1st Sts. 40°04′46″N 98°31′18″W	Red Cloud	
29	Red Cloud Bridge	Red Cloud Bridge	June 29, 1992 (#92000726)	U.S. Route 281 over the Republican River, 2 miles south of Red Cloud; 40°03′46″N 98°31′07″W	Red Cloud	
30	St. Juliana Falconieri Catholic Church	St. Juliana Falconieri Catholic Church	March 5, 1981 (#81000378)	425 W. 3rd St. 40°04′50″N 98°31′24″W	Red Cloud	
31	St. Stephenie Scandinavian Evangelical Lutheran Church	St. Stephenie Scandinavian Evangelical Lutheran Church	August 11, 1982 (#82004918)	8 miles northwest of Red Cloud; 40°11′25″N 98°35′41″W	Red Cloud	
32	Seward Street Historic District	Seward Street Historic District	February 11, 1982 (#82004933)	Roughly bounded by Walnut and Cedar Sts. and 10th and A Aves. 40°05′22″N 98°31′17″W	Red Cloud	
33	Starke Round Barn	Starke Round Barn	March 16, 1972 (#72000761)	4.5 miles east of Red Cloud on U.S. Route 136; 40°05′21″N 98°26′21″W	Red Cloud	
34	US Post Office-Red Cloud	US Post Office-Red Cloud	May 11, 1992 (#92000474)	300 N. Webster; 40°05′17″N 98°31′08″W	Red Cloud	One of 12 Nebraska post offices featuring Section of Fine Arts murals, installed in 1941.
35	Warner-Cather House	Warner-Cather House	August 11, 1982 (#82004928)	541 N. Seward St. 40°05′26″N 98°31′19″W	Red Cloud	
36	Webster County Courthouse	Webster County Courthouse	March 5, 1981 (#81000379)	225 W. 6th St. 40°05′29″N 98°31′16″W	Red Cloud	
37	Willa Cather Memorial Prairie	Willa Cather Memorial Prairie	August 12, 1982 (#82003207)	South of Red Cloud on U.S. Route 281; 40°00′35″N 98°31′41″W	Red Cloud	

== See also ==
- List of National Historic Landmarks in Nebraska
- National Register of Historic Places listings in Nebraska
