= Bentley House =

Bentley House may refer to:

in England

- Bentley House (East Sussex), a historic house in East Sussex, England

in the United States

(by state)

- Rev. Doc. Robert Bentley House, a city-designated landmark in Berkeley, California that was home to Archetype Press
- Bentley House (Springfield, Missouri), a place of interest in Springfield, Missouri
- Crowninshield-Bentley House, Salem, Massachusetts
- George Bentley House, Worcester, MA, listed on the NRHP in Massachusetts
- Matthew R. Bentley House, a historic place in Red Cloud, Nebraska
- Parks-Bentley House, a historic place in South Glens Falls, New York
- Melius-Bentley House, Ancram, NY, a historic place in Pine Plains, New York
- Wilson Alwyn "Snowflake" Bentley House, a historic place in Jericho, Vermont
