= St. Juliana Falconieri Church =

Restored church in Nebraska

St. Julian Falconieri Catholic Church (St. Juliana) is the first Roman Catholic church in Red Cloud, Nebraska, built in 1883. Abandoned by parishioners in 1903, the church was turned into a residence in 1906 after the completion of a new catholic church. Its conversion to a home altered much of the original structure, which was restored by the Willa Cather Foundation (then the Willa Cather Pioneer Memorial) after its donation to them in 1967. The church has historical significance due to its connection to the famous author, Willa Cather, especially because it was where Annie Sadilek Pavelka (the inspiration for Cather's My Ántonia) was married and her illegitimate child, baptized. Both the Willa Cather Foundation and the state of Nebraska have owned the church and, in fact, was operated cooperatively from 1994 to 2018. However, as part of the Willa Cather State Historic Sites, St. Juliana was returned to the foundation in 2019. Today, the church is available for tours and, as part of the Willa Cather Thematic Group, listed on the National Register of Historic Places since 1981.

== Early history ==
In 1882, J. L. Miner offered land near the Burlington depot to build St. Juliana Falconieri Catholic Church, so named after his wife, Julia Miner. In 1883 (the year Willa Cather moved to Red Cloud), the church was constructed using bricks made of native clay and fired by the Ludlow Brick Company in Red Cloud, a business mentioned in Cather's ‘’The Song of the Lark’’. Its front and side facades were built with three bays containing tall, two over two double-hung sash, routed floral motifs and stilted segmentally arched hoods. The windows were of “poor man’s stained glass” and the entrance had double doors with a halved transom. Other original features included a braced hood over the entrance and a wood balustrade, which were replicated by the Willa Cather Foundation in the 1968-69 restoration. Though there was a belfry, the building never had a bell. Instead, to indicate the time for mass, the train engineer used a certain pattern of whistling as the priest did not live in Red Cloud but came by train. Cottonwoods planted by the original parishioners still shade the roof of St. Juliana.

== Restoration ==
The heirs of Ethel Barnes donated St. Juliana to the Willa Cather Foundation in 1968, and restoration began with an estimated cost of $4,500 and plans that included installing an eight-foot cupola on top of the church and tearing out partitions. The first step was to tear all of the new features out (ceiling, plaster, wiring, etc.) but were careful to leave the original framing. During the project, they found doors that used to be windows and a window that had been the front door, plus a stove pipe hole above where the altar had been. Work on the outside of the church was guided by an old photograph. In 1969, the foundation received $25,000 from the Wood Charitable Fund to be used for St. Juliana and the Burlington Depot. Frank H. Wood and his wife, Nelle, knew Willa Cather as their classmate during her time at the University of Nebraska. In fact, she wrote the story of their wedding in a Lincoln newspaper. A dedication mass was held in 1970 to celebrate the completion of the restoration. This mass was opened by Sarah McPartland Delaney, whose Irish immigrant parents had brought her to St. Juliana 80 years before to be baptized. Sarah's first communion and confirmation had also been in the church, and she commented that “It looks, it feels the same as it did so many years ago.” Before the rededication, Mildred R. Bennett, first president of the Willa Cather Pioneer Memorial, encouraged the formation of a choir for St.Julian's.

Though the restoration of St. Juliana was led by the Willa Cather Foundation, the site held regional interest, eliciting donations and offers of assistance from surrounding communities. In an issue of the ‘’Willa Cather Review’’ (12.2), there is a request for any plans, pictures, or furnishings that could be used to reconstruct the church, and other issues of the newsletter show local and regional, active participation. Carrie Miner Sherwood, a close friend of Willa Cather, and Margaret Kellet remembered the original church and acted as advisors for the project. Helen Obitz, one of the founders of the Willa Cather Foundation and antique collector, gave a walnut pulpit and pews. Other donations include a Gothic-style altar brought from Europe in 1905 (Sacred Heart Church, Red Cloud) and an 1876 Latin missal (St. Mary’s Catholic Church, Aurora) as well as gifts from Mr. and Mrs. Wilfred Miller (Superior), St. Mary’s Catholic Church (Odell), and the prior of Crosier Monastery (Hastings), along with the assistance and generosity of many others.

== Connection to Willa Cather ==
Willa is known to have attended mass at St. Juliana and many of her friends were active members, including the J. L. Miner family whose father had provided the land for the church. The family lived behind Willa Cather during her childhood in Red Cloud, and both the Willa Cather Childhood Home and the J. L. Miner House are among St. Juliana as part of the Willa Cather Thematic Group, owned and operated by the Willa Cather Foundation and open to the public. Cather had no doubt listened to the music produced inside St. Juliana; Mary and later, Irene Miner played the organ. Another Willa Cather literary connection to the church is through ‘’My Antonia.’’ The novel loosely follows the life of Anna Sadilek Pavelka (Ántonia Shimerda), who went by Annie and had worked for the J. L. Miner Family as well as other Red Cloud households. She and Cather were close friends during their youth. A friendship that lasted into their adulthood as shown by their correspondence as well as the gifts sent by Cather and her visits to Annie's family when she was in Red Cloud. Before Annie married John Pavelka at St. Juliana, James William Murphy proposed to her and they were married by a fake justice of the peace, unbeknownst to Annie. Murphy left her before a priest could arrive and since they were not legally married, she returned home to give birth to their daughter, who was baptized at St. Juliana. James William Murphy's father helped to establish the church.
