= Cather House =

Cather House may refer to:

- Cather Farm, Beloit, Kansas, listed on the National Register of Historic Places (NRHP) in Kansas
- George Cather Farmstead, Bladen, Nebraska, listed on the NRHP in Nebraska
- Willa Cather House, Red Cloud, Nebraska, listed on the NRHP
- William Cather Homestead Site, Red Cloud, Nebraska, listed on the NRHP in Nebraska
- Willa Cather Birthplace, Gore, Virginia, listed on the NRHP
