= Grace Protestant Episcopal Church (Red Cloud, Nebraska) =

- U.S. National Register of Historic Places
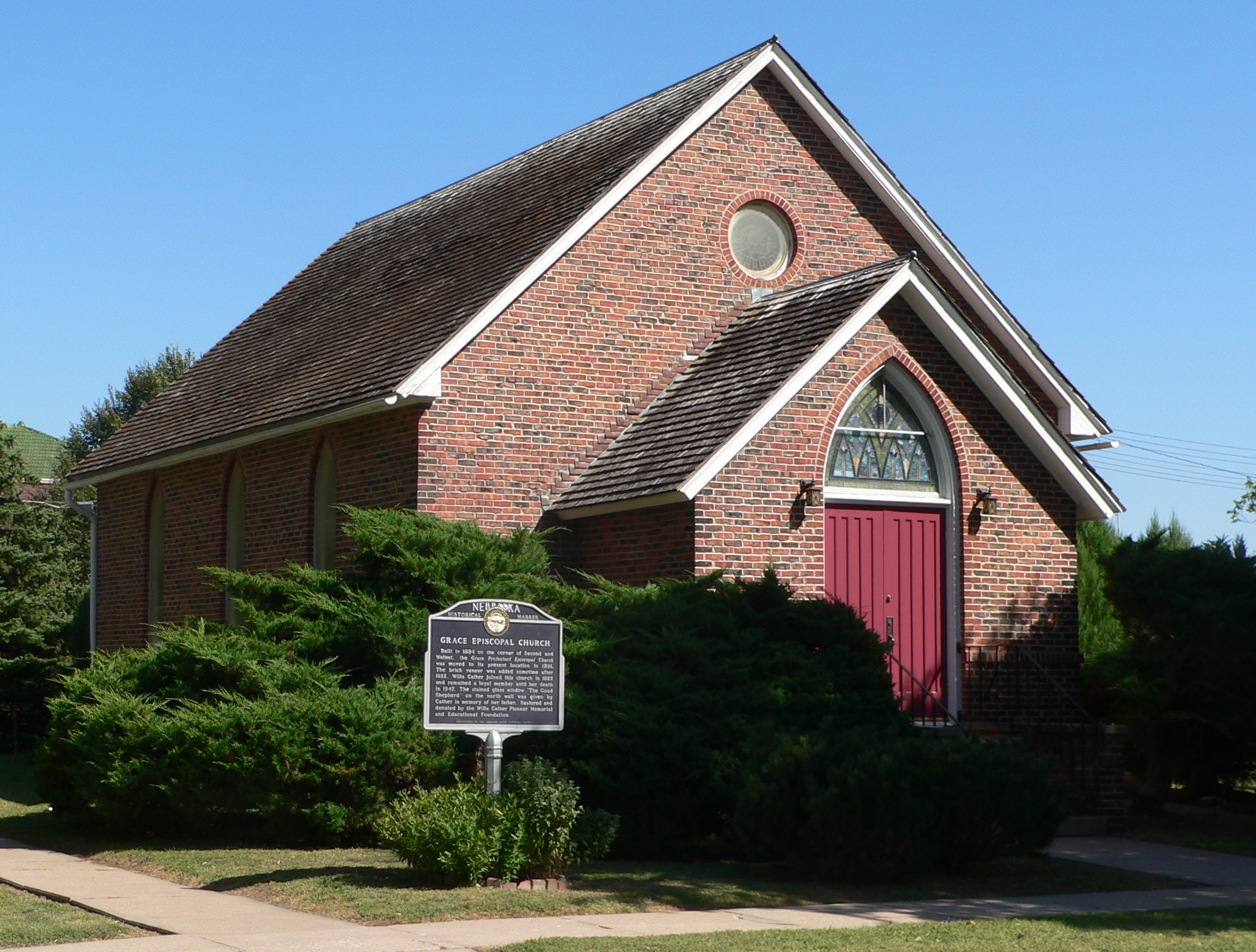
- The church in 2010

- Location within Nebraska Location within the United States
- Location: 546 North Cedar Street, Red Cloud, Nebraska
- Coordinates: 40°05′26″N 98°31′12″W
- Area: less than one acre
- Built: 1891
- Architectural style: Gothic Revival
- MPS: Willa Cather TR
- NRHP reference No.: 82004931
- Added to NRHP: February 11, 1982

The Grace Protestant Episcopal Church is a historic church building in Red Cloud, Nebraska. It was built in 1884, and designed in the Gothic Revival architectural style. Reverend Mr Crockett oversaw its construction, and the building was moved to its current location in 1891. In 1922, author Willa Cather stopped attending the First Baptist Church and began attending this church. When the Munich-style stained glass was added in the 1930s, Cather dedicated a window to her mother and another one to her father. The building has been listed on the National Register of Historic Places since February 11, 1982.
