= Cather =

Cather may refer to:

- Geoffrey Cather (1890–1916), Victoria Cross recipient
- Joan Cather (1882–1967), British suffragette, awarded a Hunger Strike Medal
- Michael Paul Cathers (1964–2023), American stand-up comedian
- Mike Cather (born 1970), American baseball player
- Sharon Cather (1947–2019), American art historian
- Ted Cather (1889–1945), American baseball player
- Willa Cather (1873–1947), American author
- William Cather Hook (1857–1921), American judge

== See also ==
- Cather Simpson, New Zealand-American physics/chemistry academic
- Cathers
- Cather House (disambiguation)
- Willa Cather Birthplace
- Willa Cather House
