= Farmer's and Merchant's Bank Building (Red Cloud, Nebraska) =

- U.S. National Register of Historic Places
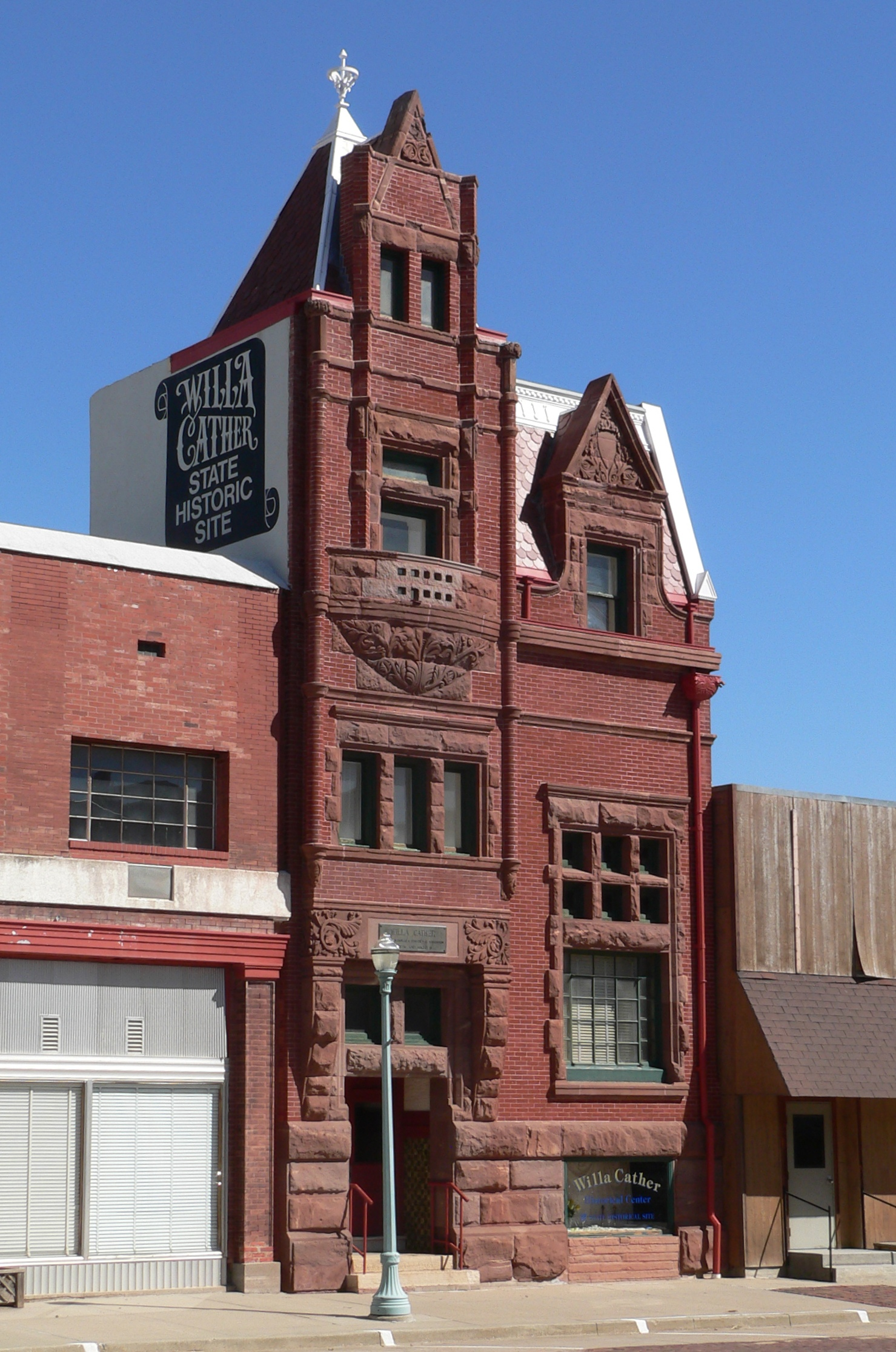
- The building in 2010

- Location within Nebraska Location within the United States
- Location: 338 North Webster Street, Red Cloud, Nebraska
- Coordinates: 40°05′19″N 98°31′07″W
- Area: less than one acre
- Built: 1888
- Architectural style: Renaissance, French Chateauesque
- MPS: Willa Cather TR
- NRHP reference No.: 81000377
- Added to NRHP: March 5, 1981

The Farmer's and Merchant's Bank Building, also known as the Garber Bank, is a historic building in Red Cloud, Nebraska. It was built in 1888-1889 by Seward Garber and John W. Moon. The bank's founding president was Silas Garber. Author Willa Cather took inspiration from the Garber family to write about Captain and Mrs Forrester in her 1923 novel, A Lost Lady. She also used the building as inspiration in her 1935 novel, Lucy Gayheart. It was designed in the Renaissance Revival architectural style. It has been listed on the National Register of Historic Places since March 5, 1981.
