= William Ducker House =

- U.S. National Register of Historic Places
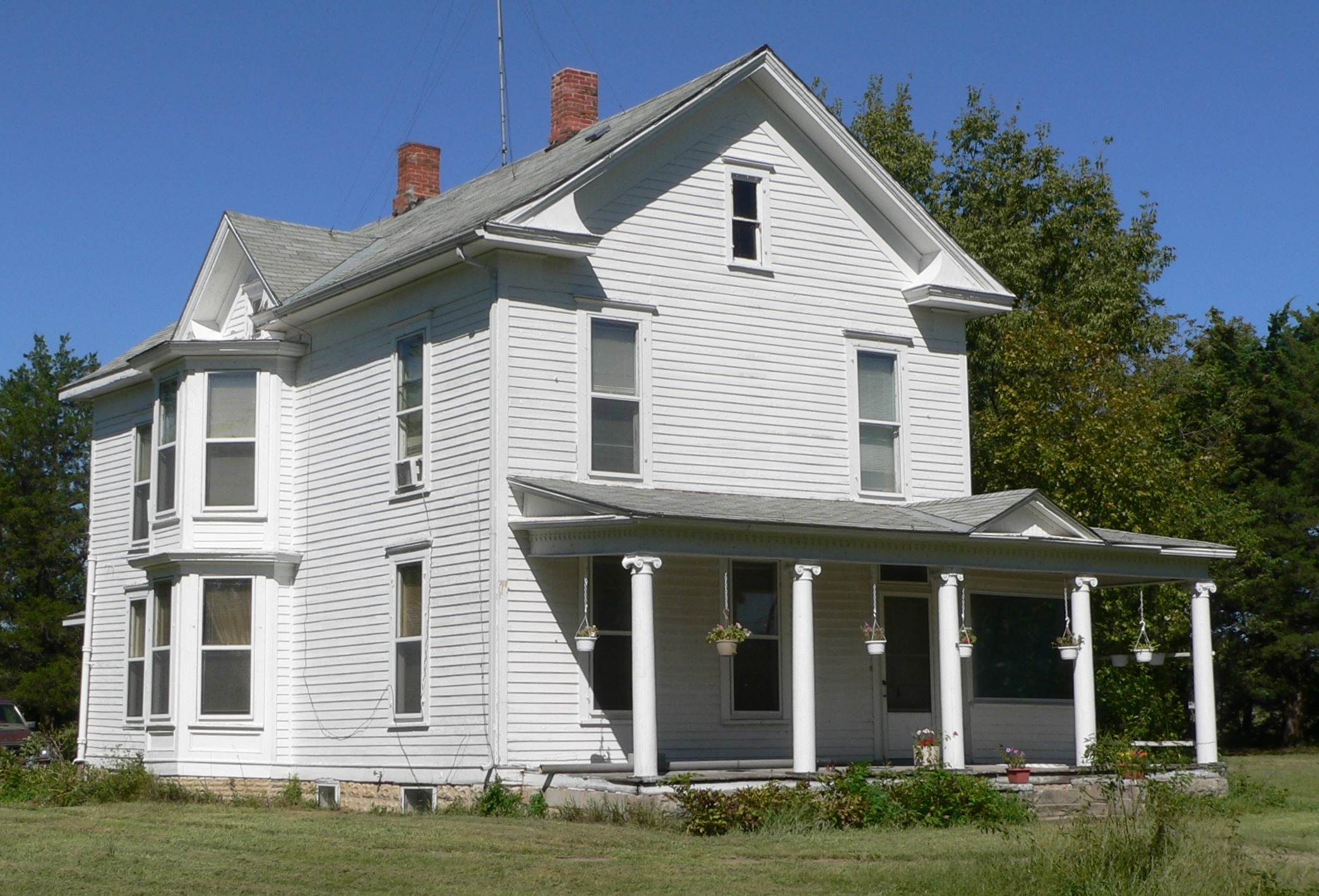
- The house in 2010

- Location within Nebraska Location within the United States
- Location: 821 Franklin Street, Red Cloud, Nebraska
- Coordinates: 40°05′37″N 98°31′40″W
- Area: less than one acre
- Architectural style: Greek Revival, Vernacular Greek Revival
- MPS: Willa Cather TR
- NRHP reference No.: 82004930
- Added to NRHP: February 11, 1982

The William Ducker House is a historic house in Red Cloud, Nebraska. It was built in 1886 by Robert Cochrane, an immigrant from England who was author Willa Cather's Latin teacher. The house was designed in the Greek Revival architectural style. The house has been listed on the National Register of Historic Places since February 11, 1982.
