= Auld Public Library =

- U.S. National Register of Historic Places
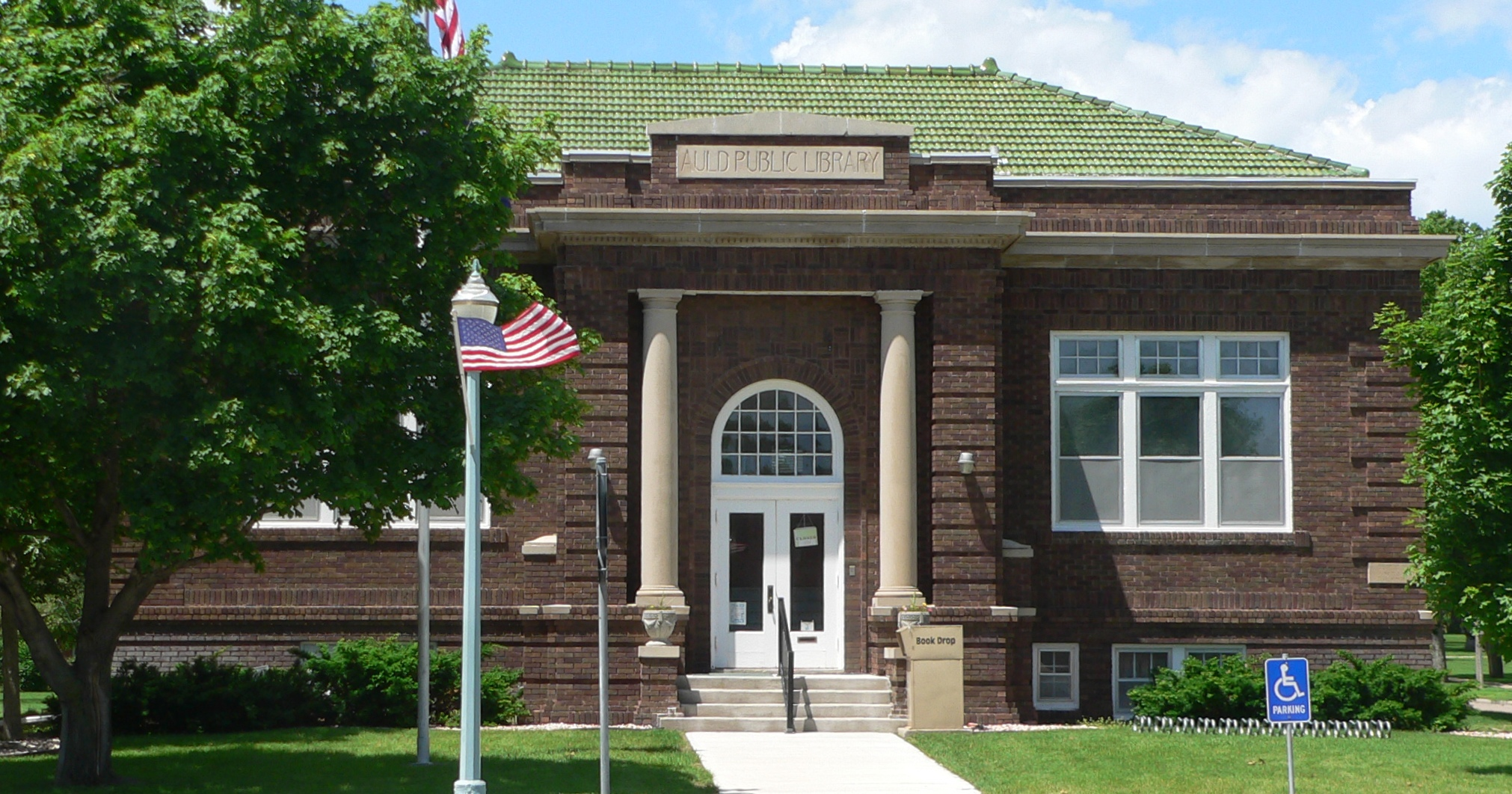
- The Auld Public Library in 2010

- Location within Nebraska Location within the United States
- Location: 537 North Webster, Red Cloud, Nebraska
- Coordinates: 40°05′26″N 98°31′10″W
- Area: less than one acre
- Built: 1917
- Architect: Fiske & Meginnis
- Architectural style: Classical Revival
- NRHP reference No.: 93001404
- Added to NRHP: December 10, 1993

The Auld Public Library is a historic building in Red Cloud, Nebraska. It was built in 1917 thanks to a donation from William T. Auld, with William N. Gedney as the general contractor. It was designed in the Classical Revival style by Fiske & Meginnis, an architectural firm based out of Lincoln, Nebraska. It has been listed on the National Register of Historic Places since December 10, 1993.
