= Warner-Cather House =

Historic house in Nebraska, United States

- U.S. National Register of Historic Places
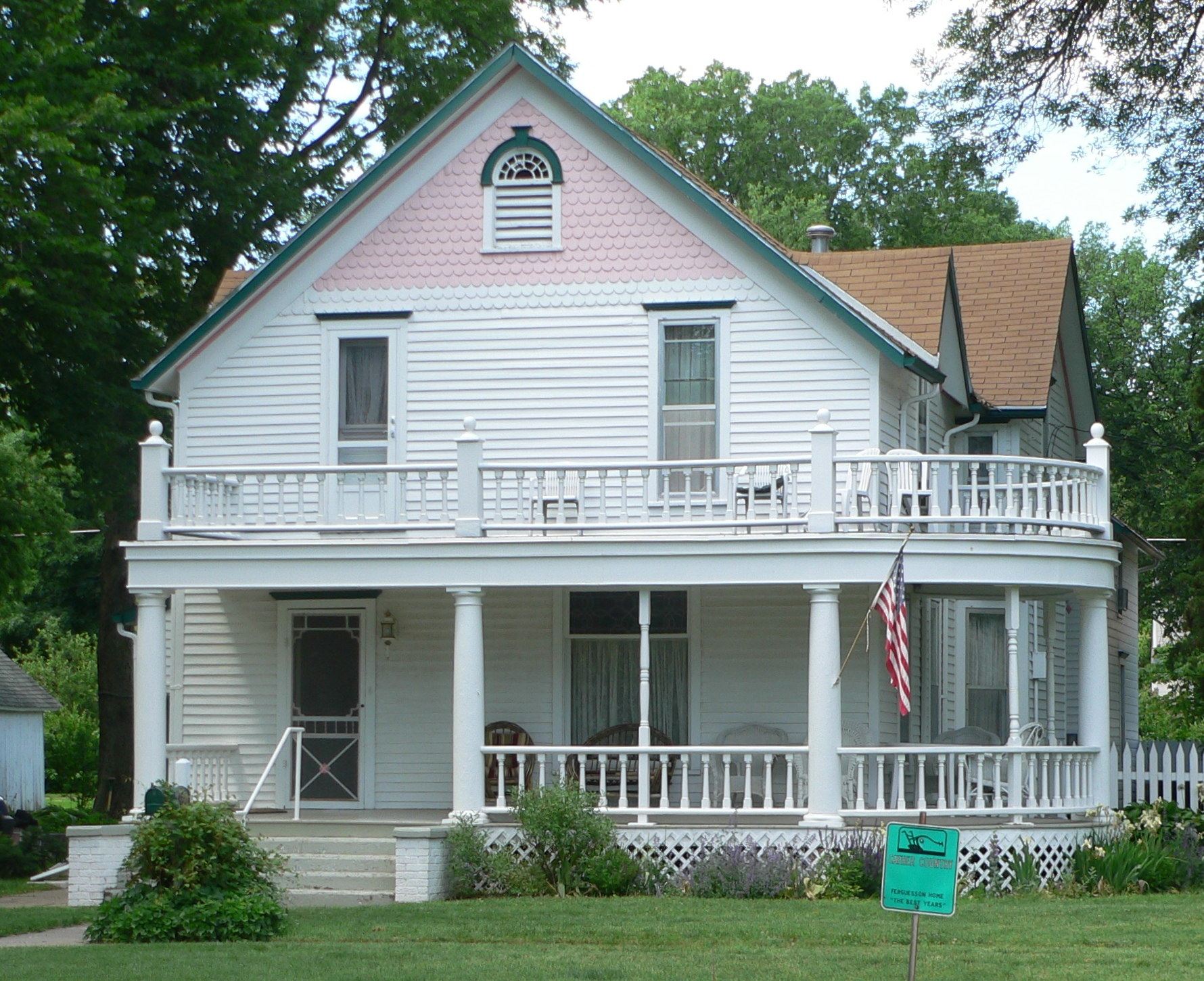
- The house in 2010

- Location within Nebraska Location within the United States
- Location: 541 North Seward Street, Red Cloud, Nebraska
- Coordinates: 40°05′26″N 98°31′19″W
- Area: less than one acre
- MPS: Willa Cather TR
- NRHP reference No.: 82004928
- Added to NRHP: August 11, 1982

The Warner-Cather House is a historic house in Red Cloud, Nebraska. It was built in the 1890s for Joseph Warner, an immigrant from England, and his American wife Sylvia. In 1904, it was purchased by Charles F. Cather, who lived here with his wife Mary. Their grown daughter, author Willa Cather, visited them for Christmas. The house has been listed on the National Register of Historic Places since August 11, 1982.
