= McKeeby =

McKeeby is a surname. Notable people with the surname include:

- Byron McKeeby (1936-1984), American artist, educator, and master printmaker
- Gilbert E. McKeeby (1844-1905), American physician and politician

== See also ==
- Dr. Gilbert McKeeby House, a historic house in Red Cloud, Nebraska
