= Willa Cather Foundation =

American not-for-profit organization

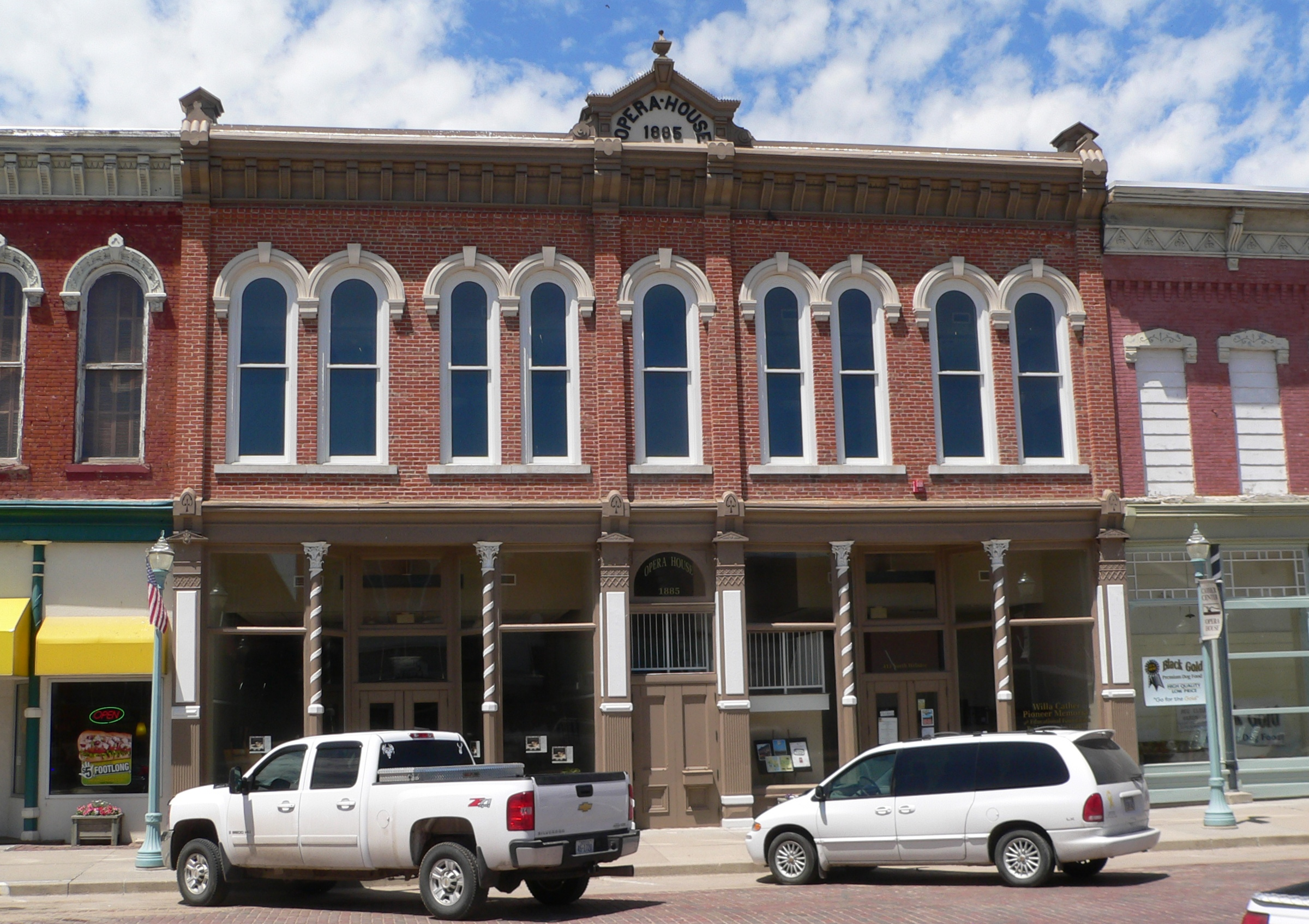
- Red Cloud Opera House, now the foundation's headquarters, in Red Cloud, Nebraska
- Founded: 1955 (71 years ago)
- Founder: Local volunteers, under direction of Mildred R. Bennett
- Type: Non-profit
- Location: Red Cloud, Nebraska, United States
- Coordinates: 40.08912°N 98.51948°W
- Website: willacather.org

The Willa Cather Foundation is an American not-for-profit organization, headquartered in Red Cloud, Nebraska, dedicated to preserving the archives and settings associated with Willa Cather (1873–1947), a Pulitzer Prize-winning author, and promoting the appreciation of her work. Established in 1955, the Foundation is a 501(c)(3) not-for-profit organization that promotes Willa Cather's legacy through education, preservation, and the arts. Programs and services include regular guided historic site tours, conservation of the 612 acre Willa Cather Memorial Prairie, and organization of year-round cultural programs and exhibits at the restored Red Cloud Opera House.

In 2017, the Willa Cather Foundation opened the National Willa Cather Center—an archive, museum, and study center in downtown Red Cloud which houses the Red Cloud Opera House, art gallery, bookstore, a permanent exhibit on the life and works of Willa Cather, "American Bittersweet," and an expansive, climate-controlled Special Collections & Archives. The Foundation houses growing archival and museum collections and preserves ten properties that make up the largest collection of nationally designated historic sites related to an American author.

== Founding ==
The organization was founded in 1955 in Red Cloud, the small town that appears frequently in Willa Cather's novels and stories under a variety of names.

Cather, born in Virginia in 1873, moved with her family to rural Webster County, Nebraska, in 1883; in late 1884 the family resettled in the county seat of Red Cloud, where Cather lived until beginning her college studies at the University of Nebraska in Lincoln in 1890.

Established as the Willa Cather Pioneer Memorial, the foundation was organized by a group of local volunteers under the direction of Mildred R. Bennett, a South Dakota native who had originally come to Webster County in 1932 as a schoolteacher and eventually became an important early figure in Cather studies. Bennett's The World of Willa Cather, published in 1951, was the first full-length biography to be published following Cather's death in 1947, and remains a useful resource for studying Cather's Nebraska milieu.

== Early focus ==
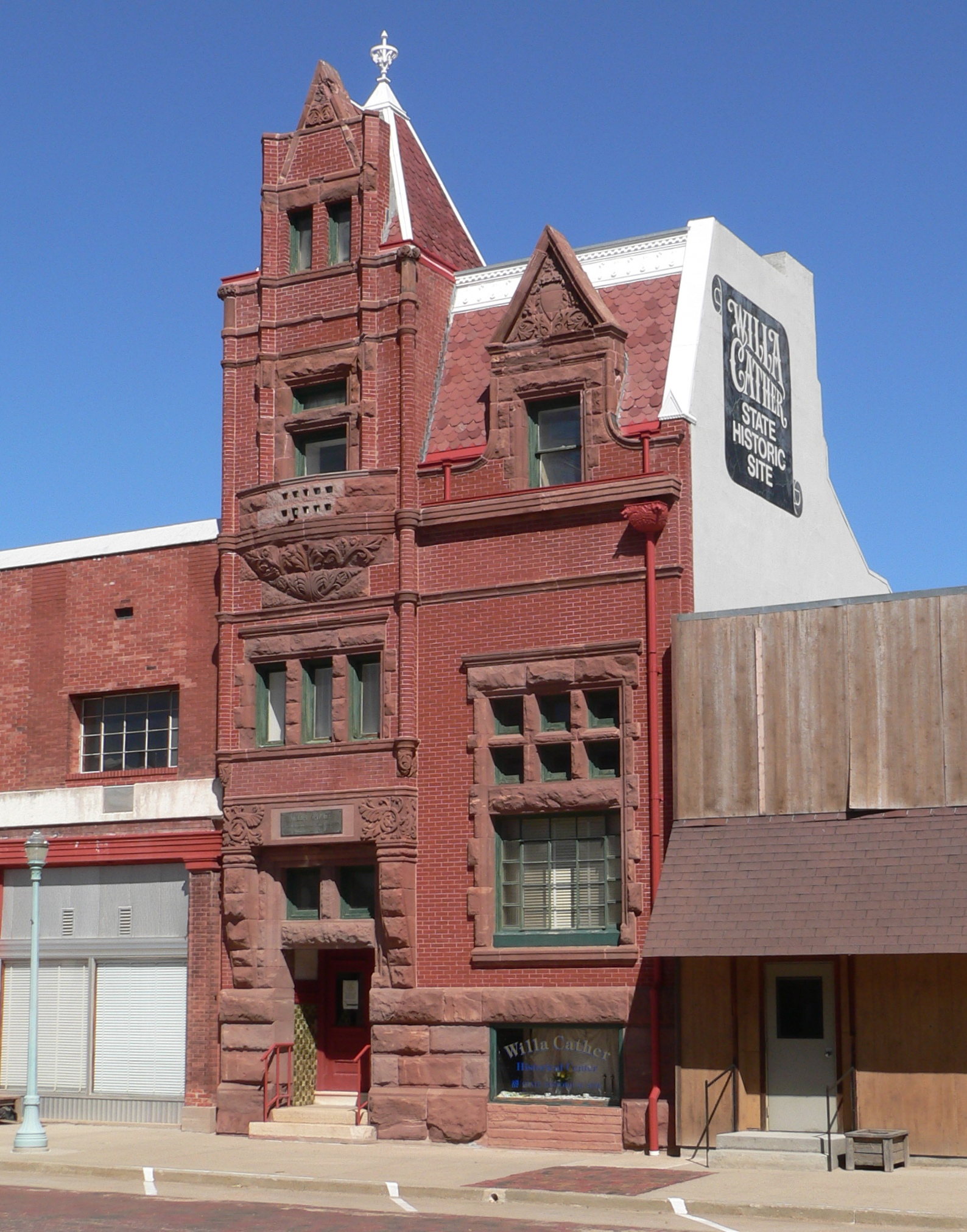
Farmers' and Merchants' Bank building in Red Cloud, Nebraska

Acknowledging the scope of its activities in its early years, in 1965 the organization renamed itself the Willa Cather Pioneer Memorial and Educational Foundation. Under Bennett's direction, the foundation's primary early focus was the preservation and restoration of sites in and around Red Cloud that figure in Cather's life and work.

By 1976, the foundation's properties included:

- Willa Cather Childhood Home
- Farmers' and Merchants' Bank building, erected by Silas Garber, the prototype for the Captain Forrester figure in the novel A Lost Lady (1923)
- Burlington Depot, which appears throughout Cather's work
- St. Juliana Falconieri Catholic Church, where "Ántonia" of the novel My Ántonia (1918) – in real life, Cather's friend Annie Sadilek Pavelka – was married
- Grace Episcopal Church, which Cather and her parents joined in 1922, and which houses a pair of painted-glass windows donated by Cather in memory of her parents
- Pavelka Farmstead, the rural setting for the final scenes in My Ántonia

In 1978, the Nebraska State Historical Society assumed ownership of these properties and the archival materials amassed by the Foundation to that date. The Foundation continued to manage these sites and kept them open for visitors.

Additional historic sites maintained by the Foundation were added in later years and have been owned outright. They include:

- J. L. Miner House, which was the home of the Harling family in My Ántonia
- Willa Cather Memorial Prairie, a 612-acre (2.48 km^{2}) virgin mixed-grass prairie five miles (8 km) south of Red Cloud
- Red Cloud Opera House (built in 1885), which prominently featured in the novels The Song of the Lark (1915) and Lucy Gayheart (1935)

== Recent activities ==
From 2007 to 2017, the organization operated as the Willa Cather Foundation, directed by a thirty-member board of governors including scholars, educators, and professionals from throughout the United States. In 2019, the organization, which retains its non-profit status under the Willa Cather Foundation name, rebranded as the National Willa Cather Center (completed in 2017).

It publishes the Willa Cather Review, a journal of scholarly articles and foundation news, and holds an annual spring conference in Red Cloud. With rotating academic partners, the foundation hosts a biennial International Cather Seminar for scholars and Cather readers. It continues to offer year-round tours in Red Cloud and host visiting scholars and researchers. The foundation awards the Norma Ross Walter scholarship, given annually to a female graduate of a Nebraska high school intending to major in English. Since the 2003 restoration of the Red Cloud Opera House, which houses a theater and gallery, the foundation also operates as a regional arts center.

In 2019, Nebraska State Historical Society transferred ownership of all historic Cather-related sites back to the Willa Cather Foundation. In addition, over 8,000 Cather-related documents and artifacts returned to Red Cloud to the care of the new Special Collections & Archives, opened in 2017 at the National Willa Cather Center.
