= Red Cloud United States Post Office =

- U.S. Post Office-Red Cloud
- U.S. National Register of Historic Places
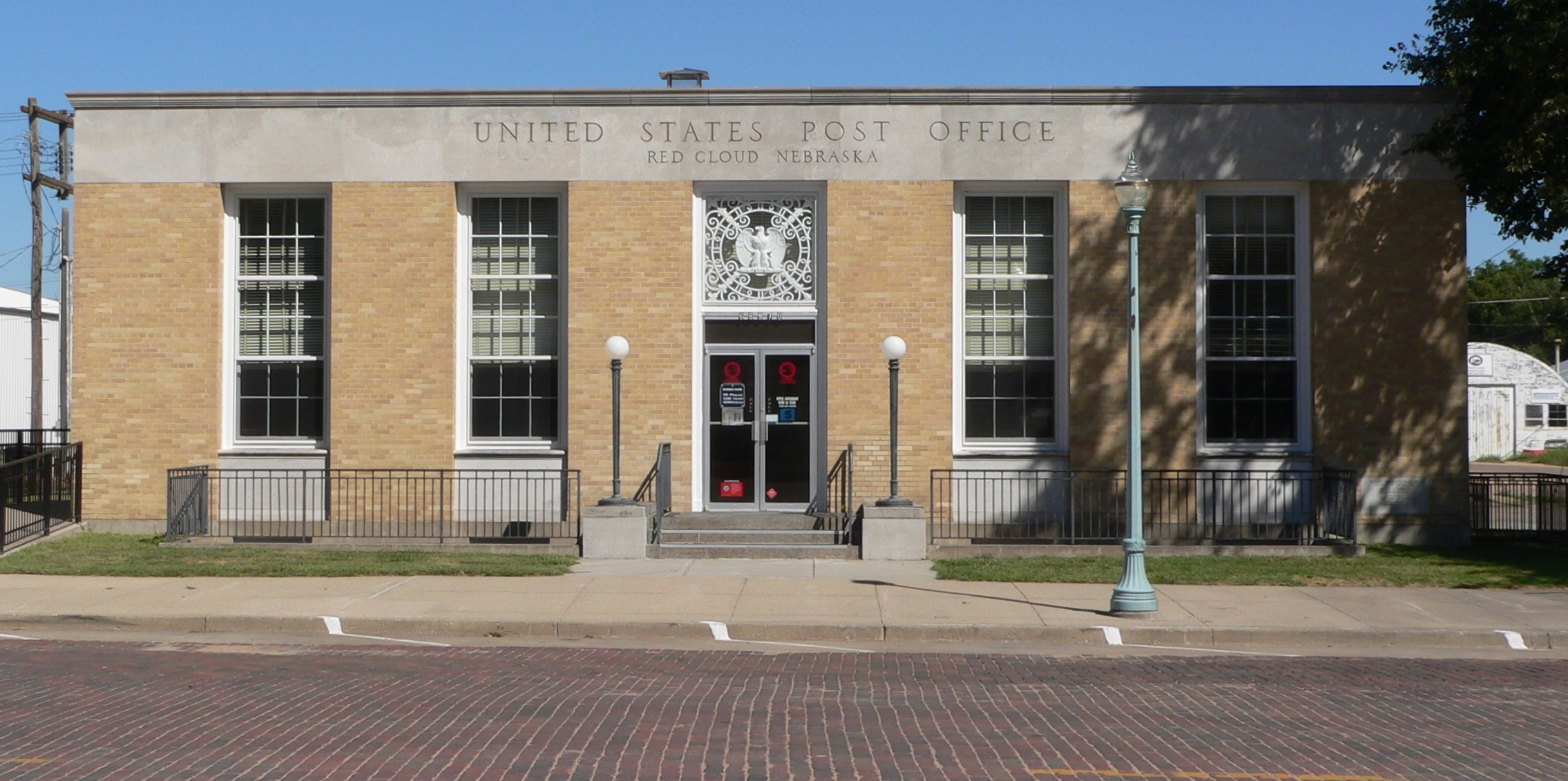

- Location within Nebraska Location within the United States
- Location: 300 N. Webster, Red Cloud, Nebraska
- Coordinates: 40°05′17″N 98°31′07″W
- Area: less than one acre
- Built: 1941
- Architectural style: Moderne
- MPS: Nebraska Post Offices Which Contain Section Artwork (1938-42) MPS
- NRHP reference No.: 92000474
- Added to NRHP: May 11, 1992

The Red Cloud United States Post Office, at 300 N. Webster in Red Cloud, Nebraska, was built in 1941 in Moderne style.

It includes three panels of mural artwork, painted on canvas by artist Archie Musick. The three panels, titled "Moving Westward," "Stockade Builders," and "Loading Cattle," depict the movement of Indian tribes to the west, the beginning of white settlement, and cowboys loading cattle into pens.

It was listed on the National Register of Historic Places in 1992 as U.S. Post Office-Red Cloud. The listing included the building and three contributing objects.
