= Starke Round Barn =

- U.S. National Register of Historic Places
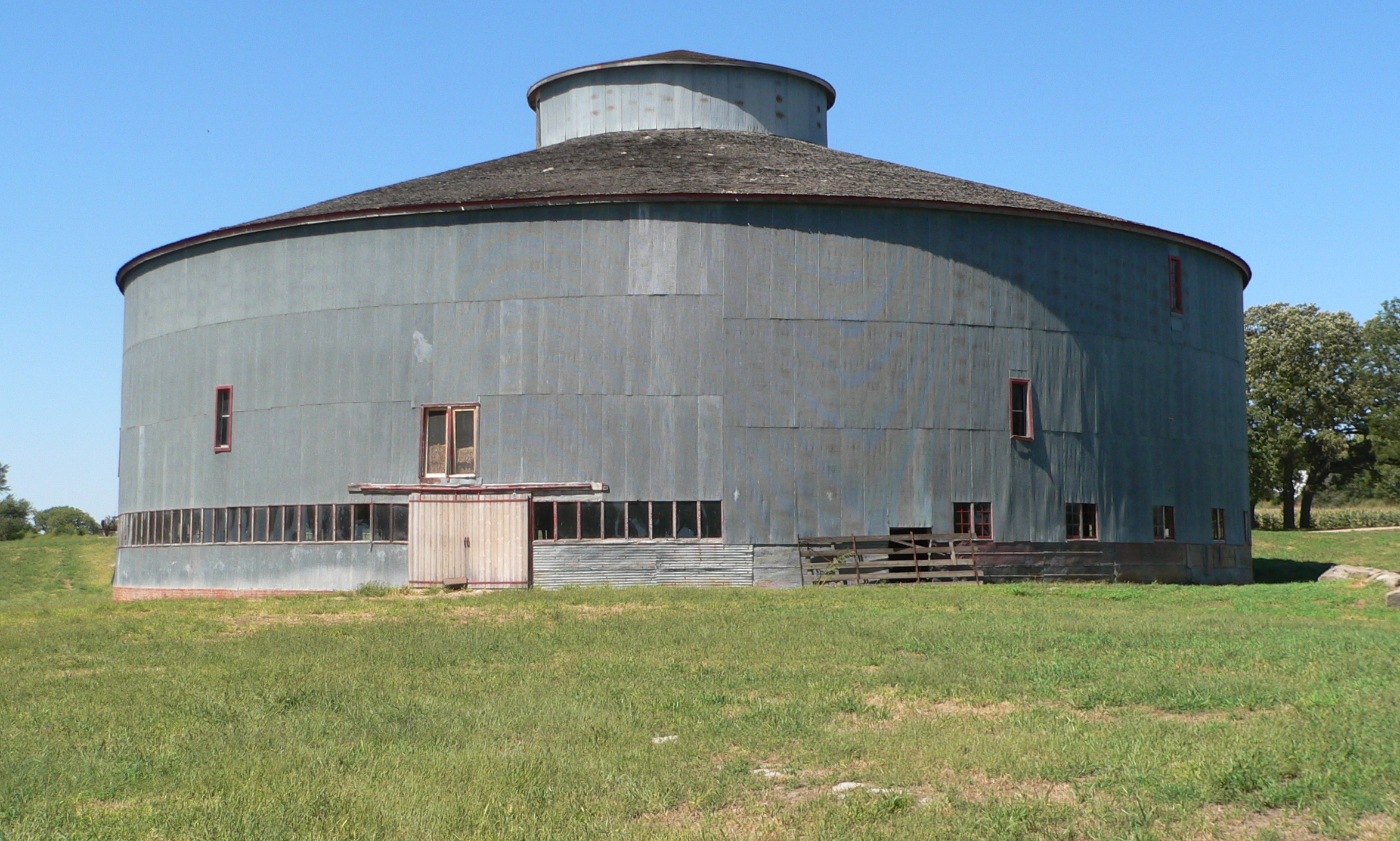

- Location within Nebraska Location within the United States
- Nearest city: Red Cloud, Nebraska
- Coordinates: 40°5′8.6″N 98°26′12.2″W
- Area: 2 acres (0.81 ha)
- Built: 1902
- Built by: Starke, Conrad, et al.
- NRHP reference No.: 72000761
- Added to NRHP: March 16, 1972

The Starke Round Barn near Red Cloud, Nebraska, United States, is a round barn that was built in 1902. It was listed on the National Register of Historic Places in 1972.

The barn has been restored and now holds tours on request.
