= Chalk Cliff and Republican River =

Conservation area in Nebraska, US

- U.S. National Register of Historic Places
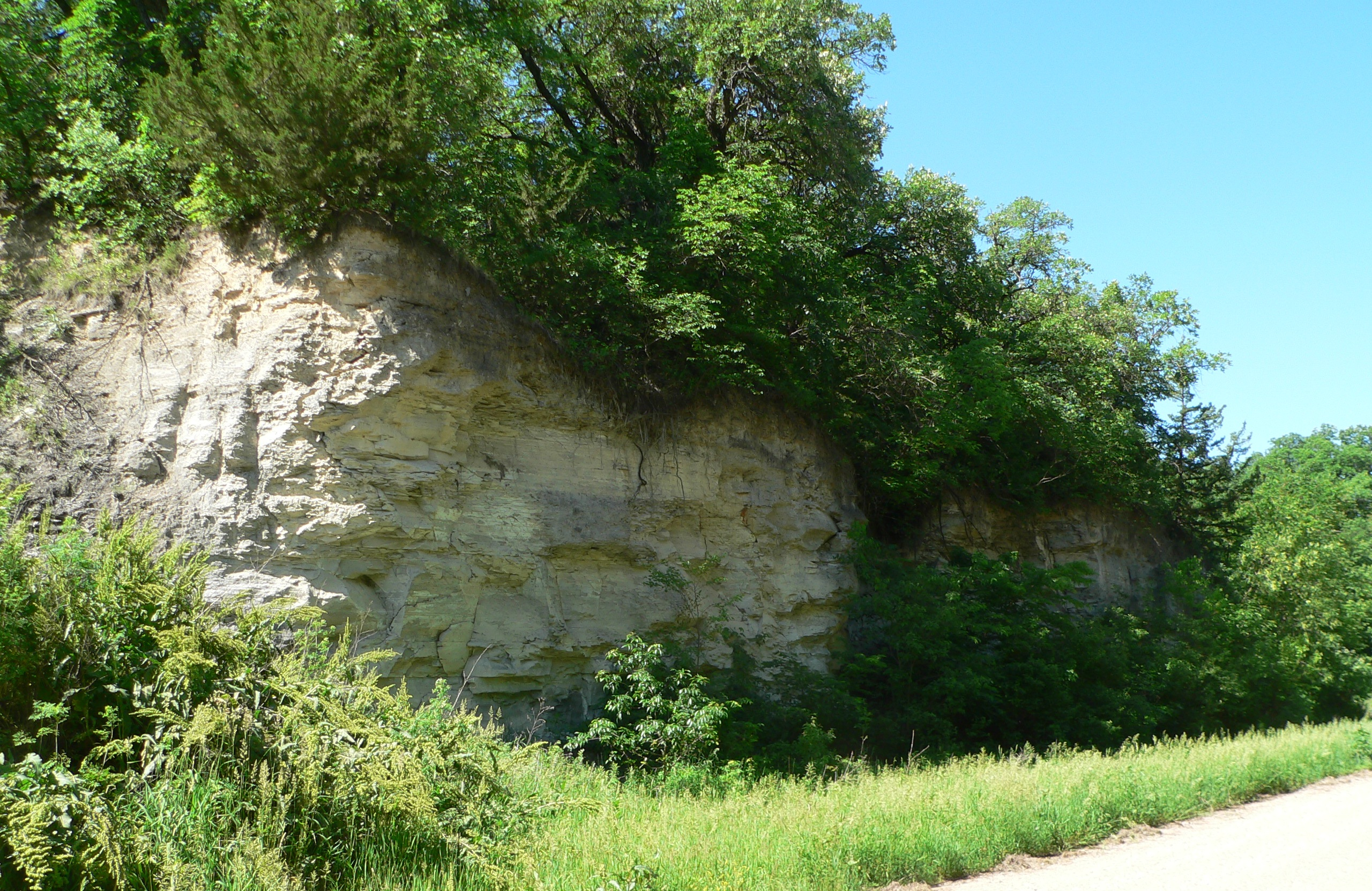

- Location within Nebraska Location within the United States
- Nearest city: Red Cloud, Nebraska
- Coordinates: 40°03′43″N 98°31′23″W
- Area: 50 acres (20 ha)
- MPS: Willa Cather TR
- NRHP reference No.: 82004919
- Added to NRHP: August 11, 1982

The Chalk Cliff and Republican River is a conservation area in Webster County, Nebraska, near Red Cloud, Nebraska, which was listed on the National Register of Historic Places in 1982.

It preserves a landscape area written about by Willa Cather.

Included are "chalk cliffs", which are exposed bluffs along the south edge of the Republican River, and a portion of the river.

It is located 1 mile south of Red Cloud.
