= Joe George =

Sailor in the U.S. Navy (1915–1996)

Joseph Leon George (October 8, 1915 – September 27, 1996) was a sailor in the United States Navy who received the Bronze Star with a "V" Device for Valor for his heroism during the attack on Pearl Harbor. As a Petty Officer First Class on the USS Vestal (AR-4) on December 7, 1941, he disobeyed orders and threw a line from the Vestal to the sinking USS Arizona (BB-39). Six trapped sailors escaped to safety using the lifeline.

== Early life ==
George was born on October 8, 1915, in Franklin, Georgia. He enlisted into the Navy in 1935.

== Pearl Harbor ==
George was stationed at Pearl Harbor as a Boatswain's Mate Second Class. On December 6, 1941, George was informed that he was facing a summary court-martial due to a fight. On December 7, 1941, Pearl Harbor was attacked. George woke up other sailors and fought fires on the USS Vestal. A senior officer ordered George to cut the line connecting the USS Vestal to the USS Arizona, which was sinking. George, spotting six sailors aboard the USS Arizona calling for help, threw a line to them. The six sailors were able to evacuate the ship and were the last six sailors to escape alive.

== Aftermath ==
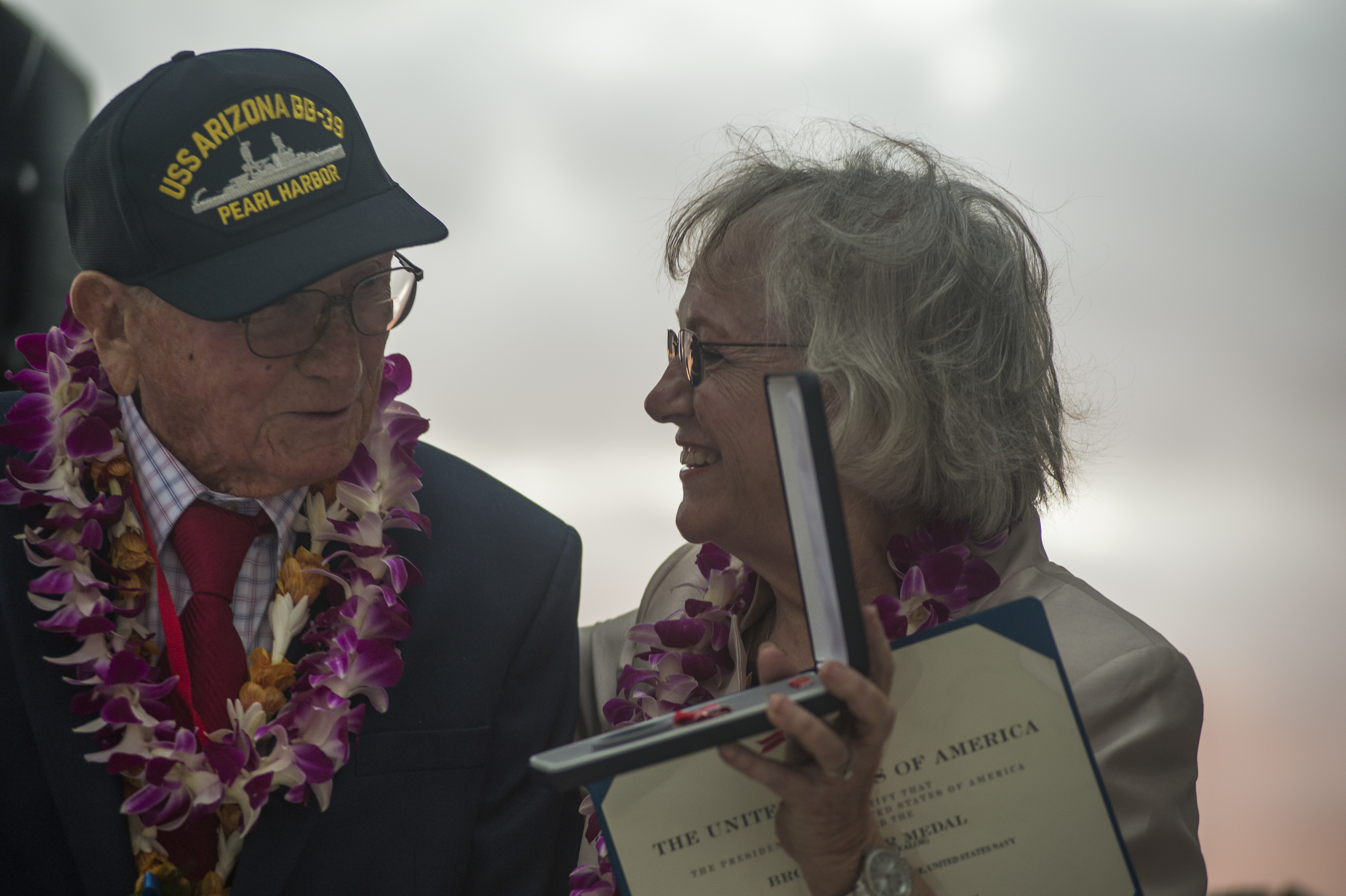
Donald Stratton (left) views George's Bronze Star, held by George's daughter, Joe Ann Taylor (right).

George was commended for his efforts by Captain Cassin Young. After retiring from the Navy, George worked at the Alameda Air Station. In a 1978 interview with University of North Texas, George testified about his experience for the first time. George died on September 27, 1996, in Franklin, Georgia.

Randy Stratton, the son of one of the sailors rescued by George, discovered George's identity and learned that he was never given a medal for his heroics. Stratton, along with George's daughter, Joe Ann Taylor, unsuccessfully attempted to have George honored for years. In 2017, U.S. senator Jeff Flake introduced a resolution recognizing George's action. George was posthumously awarded the Bronze Star in 2017. Although there were only five living USS Arizona survivors at the time of the ceremony, two of them were sailors George had rescued, Lauren Bruner and Donald Stratton, who both attended the ceremony. The medal ceremony was the first ever held at the USS Arizona Memorial.
