= Donald Stratton =

American veteran (1922–2020)

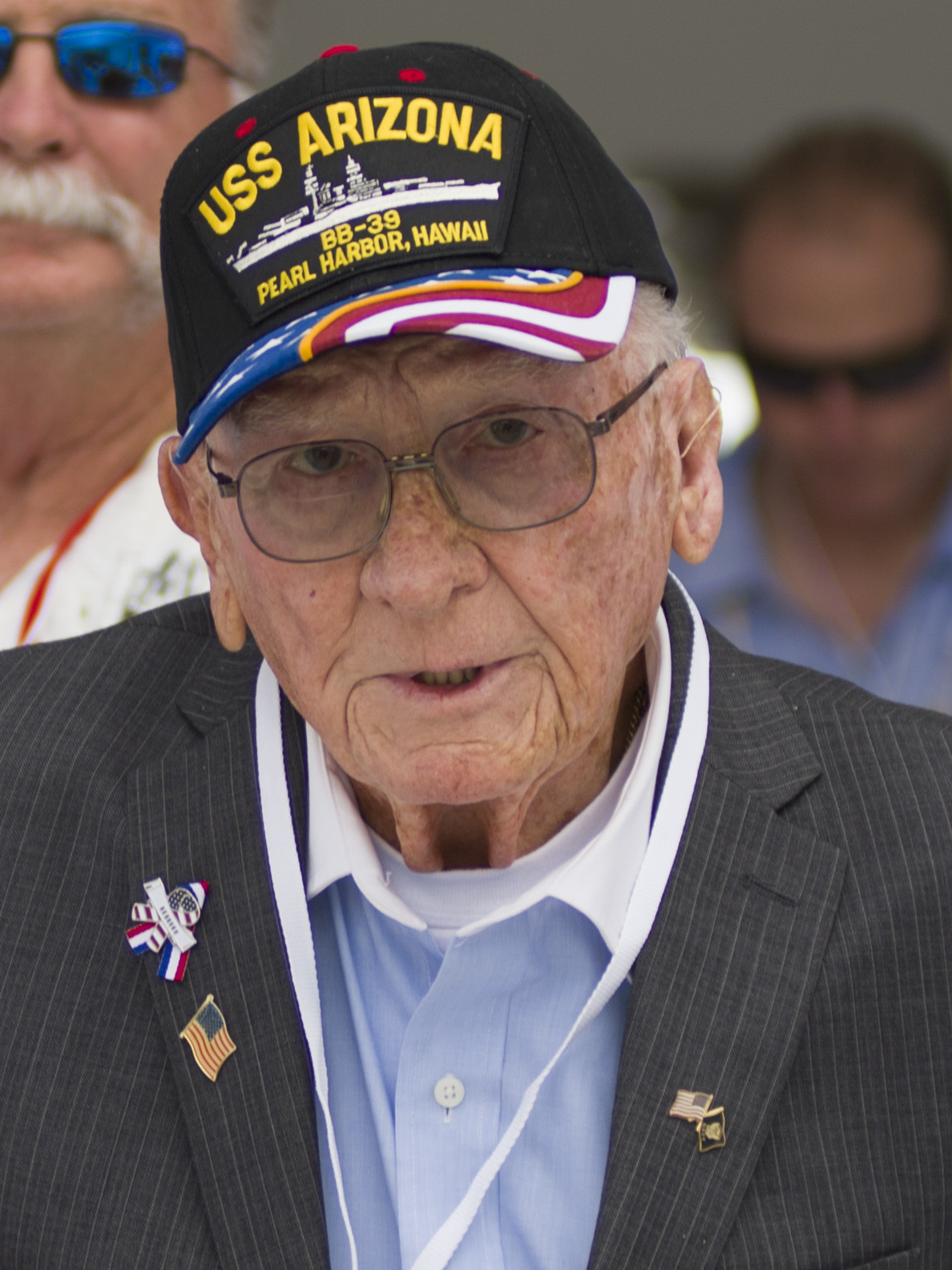
- Born: July 14, 1922; Red Cloud, Nebraska, U.S.
- Died: February 15, 2020 (aged 97); Colorado Springs, Colorado, U.S.
- Military career
- Allegiance: United States
- Branch: United States Navy
- Unit: USS Arizona
- Conflicts: World War II: Attack on Pearl Harbor

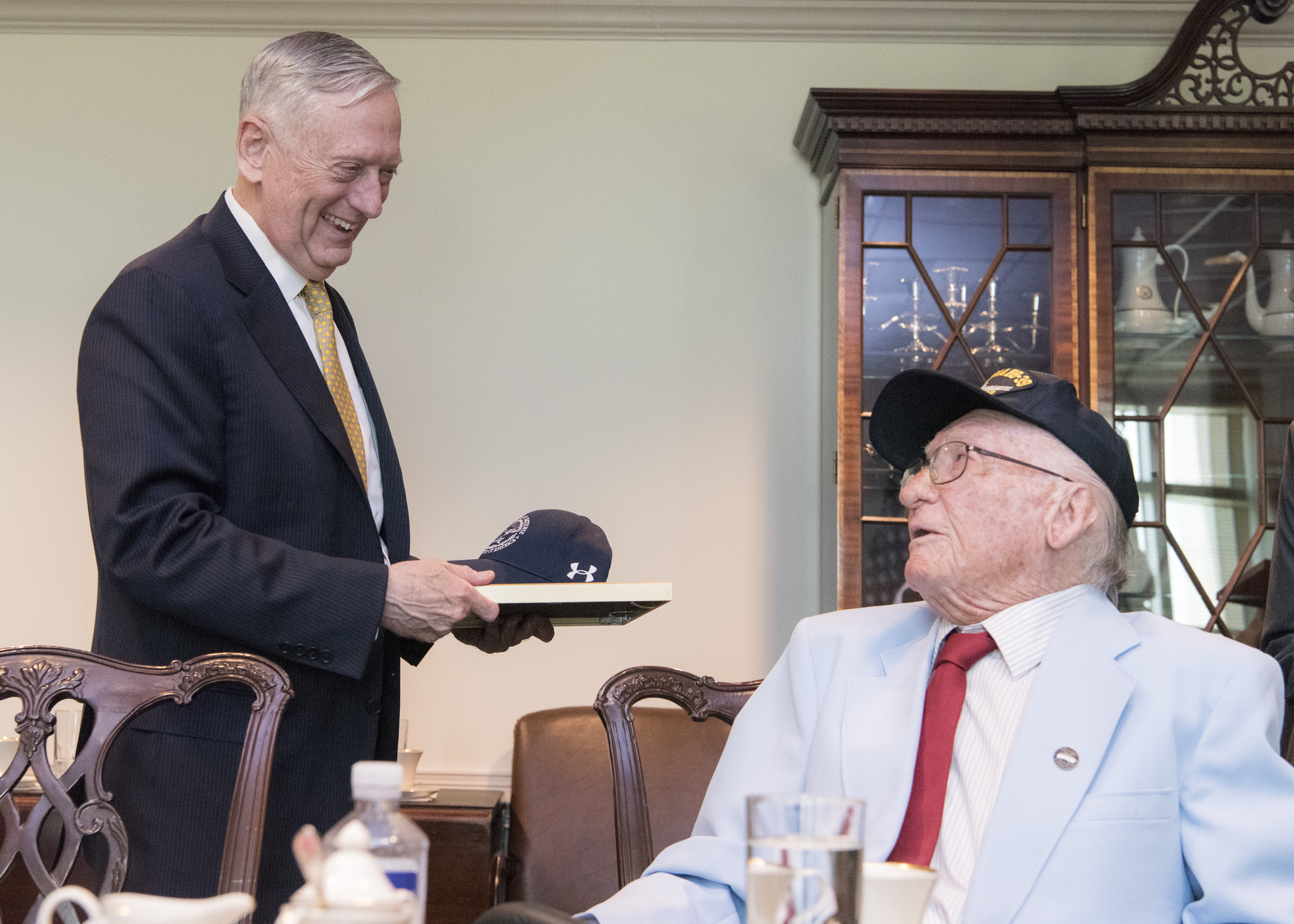

Donald Stratton (July 14, 1922 – February 15, 2020) was an American veteran and memoirist of World War II who served in the United States Navy's Pacific Fleet. He was in the port gun director of the ship USS Arizona during the attack on Pearl Harbor, when an armor-piercing bomb set off the ship's forward ammunition magazine. A sailor from a nearby ship, Joe George, threw a line to the sinking Arizona. Stratton was one of six trapped sailors who escaped to safety using the lifeline. One of the six died in hospital the evening of December 7.

On June 8, 2018 in Colorado Springs, Colorado, a dedication ceremony took place to name the bridge for the newly constructed interchange at interstate 25 and Fillmore Street in Stratton's honor.

== Works ==
- Stratton, Donald; Gire, Ken (2016). All the Gallant Men: The First Memoir by a USS Arizona Survivor. New York: HarperCollins. ISBN 9780062645357. OCLC 1066033026.
