= J. L. Miner House =

- U.S. National Register of Historic Places
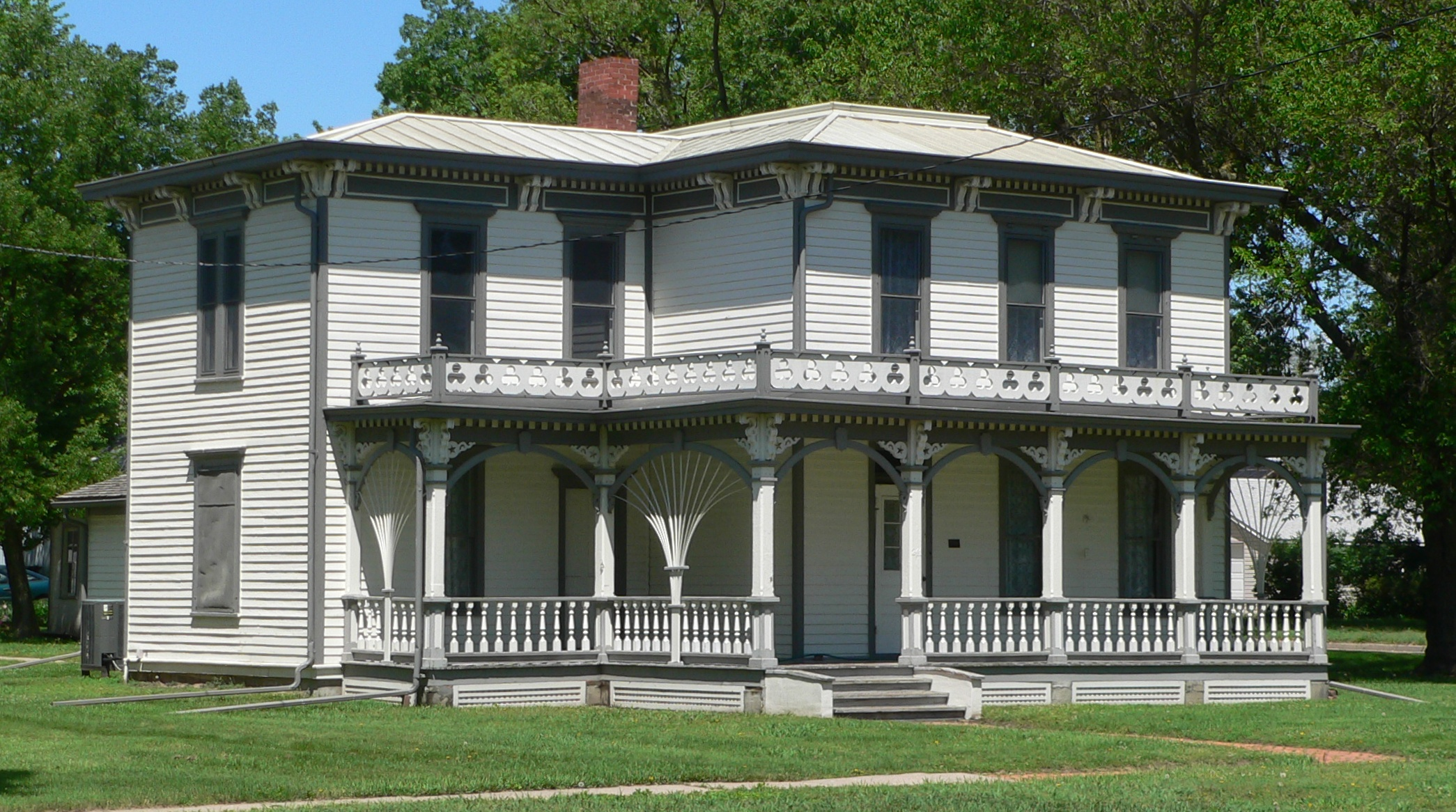
- The house in 2010

- Location within Nebraska Location within the United States
- Location: 241 North Seward, Red Cloud, Nebraska
- Coordinates: 40°05′15″N 98°31′19″W
- Area: less than one acre
- Built: 1878
- Built by: J.L. Miner, Hugh Miner
- Architectural style: Italianate
- MPS: Willa Cather TR
- NRHP reference No.: 82004922
- Added to NRHP: August 11, 1982

The J. L. Miner House is a historic house in Red Cloud, Nebraska. It was built in 1878 by J. L. Miner and Hugh Miner. Author Willa Cather was friends with the Miners's children, and she took inspiration from them to write about the Harling family in her 1918 novel, My Ántonia. The house was designed in the Italianate architectural style. It has been listed on the National Register of Historic Places since August 11, 1982.
