= Matthew R. Bentley House =

- U.S. National Register of Historic Places
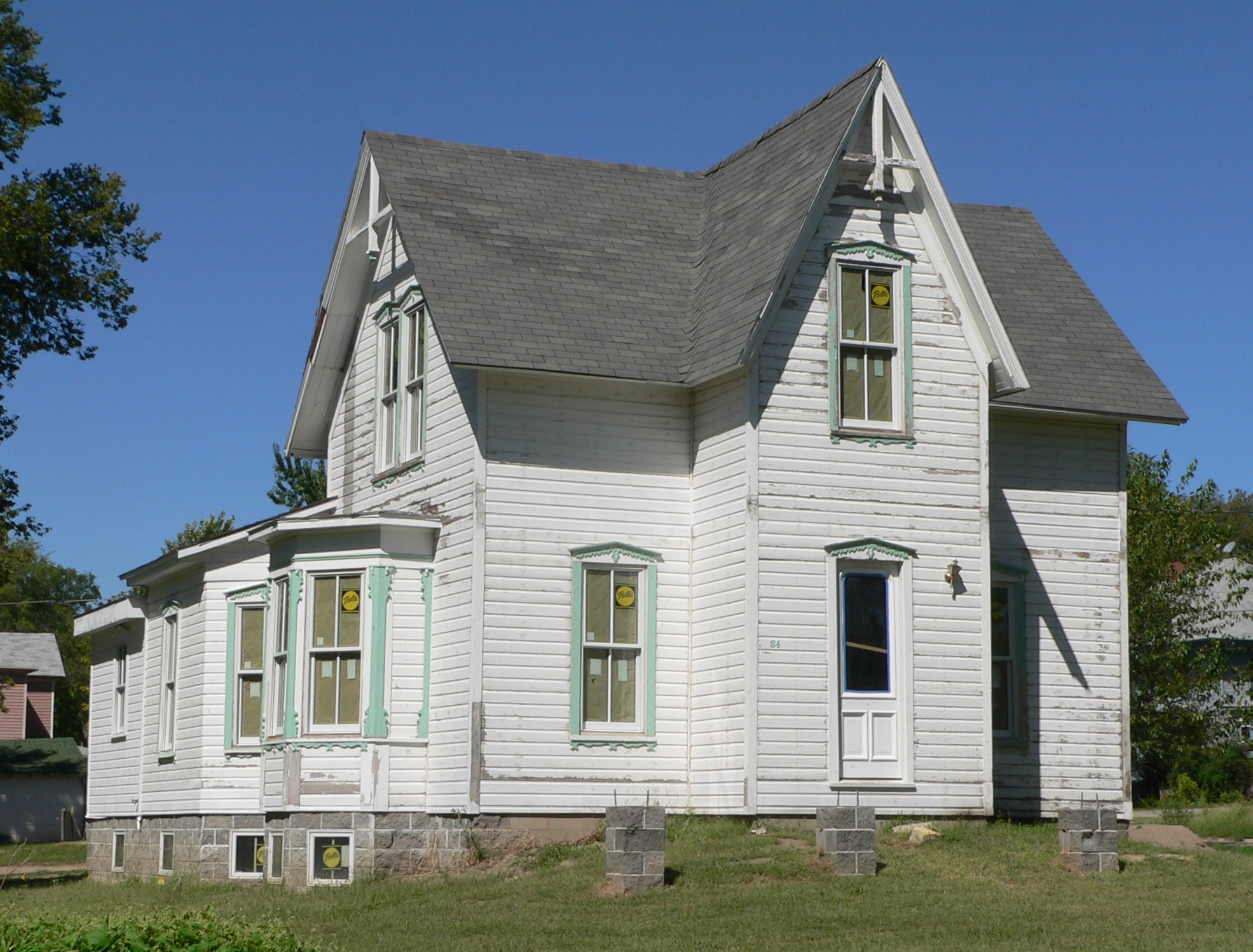
- The house in 2010

- Location within Nebraska Location within the United States
- Location: 845 North Cedar, Red Cloud, Nebraska
- Coordinates: 40°05′38″N 98°31′14″W
- Area: less than one acre
- Built by: J. Brubaker
- Architectural style: Gothic Revival
- MPS: Willa Cather TR
- NRHP reference No.: 82004927
- Added to NRHP: August 11, 1982

The Matthew R. Bentley House is a historic house in Red Cloud, Nebraska. It was built in 1883 by J. Brubaker, a carpenter. Author Willa Cather took inspiration from the house for her 1915 novel, The Song of the Lark, in which she describes Duke Block. The house was designed in the Gothic Revival architectural style. It has been listed on the National Register of Historic Places since August 11, 1982.
