= Dr. Gilbert McKeeby House =

- U.S. National Register of Historic Places
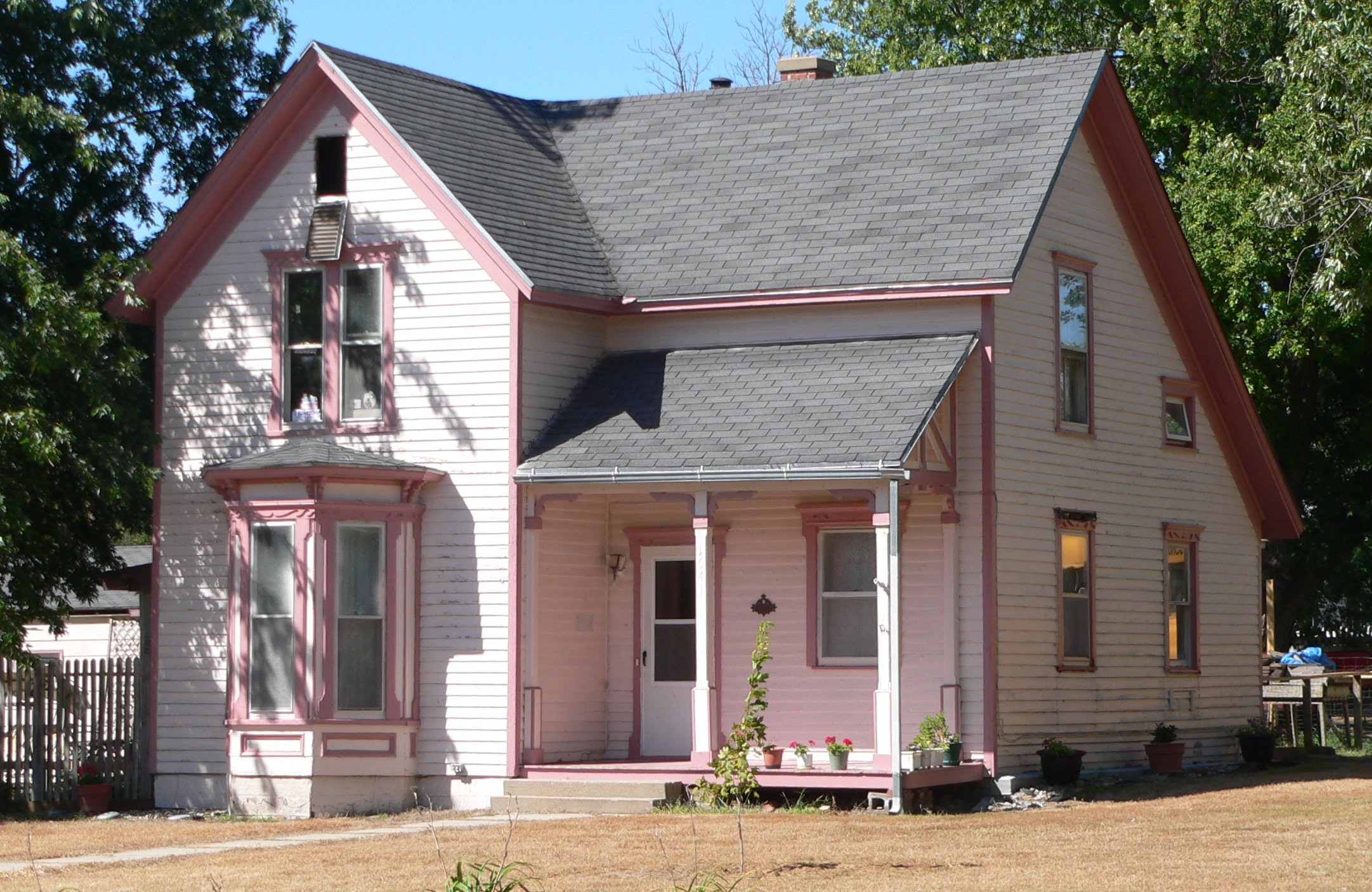
- The house in 2010

- Location within Nebraska Location within the United States
- Location: 641 North Cherry Street, Red Cloud, Nebraska
- Coordinates: 40°05′30″N 98°31′34″W
- Area: less than one acre
- Architectural style: Late Victorian, Vernacular Greek Revival
- MPS: Willa Cather TR
- NRHP reference No.: 82004937
- Added to NRHP: August 11, 1982

The Dr. Gilbert McKeeby House is a historic house in Red Cloud, Nebraska. It was built in 1883 for Dr. Gilbert McKeeby, a physician from New York City. His friend, author Willa Cather, based the character of Dr. Archie on him in her 1915 novel, The Song of the Lark. The house was designed in the Victorian architectural style, with a Vernacular Greek Revival porch. It has been listed on the National Register of Historic Places since August 11, 1982.
