= Red Cloud station =

Restored railroad depot in Nebraska

- Burlington Depot
- U.S. National Register of Historic Places
- U.S. Historic district – Contributing property
- Location: Red Cloud, Nebraska
- Coordinates: 40°05′N 98°31′W
- Built: 1897
- Part of: Willa Cather Thematic Group (ID64000481)
- NRHP reference No.: 81000376
- Added to NRHP: 1981

The Burlington Depot is a restored former railroad station in Red Cloud, Nebraska, known for its association with novelist Willa Cather. The depot was constructed in 1897 for the Burlington and Missouri River Railroad, and has been owned by the Willa Cather Foundation since 1965. The depot was listed on the National Register of Historic Places in 1981 as part of the Willa Cather Thematic Group, a multiple property submission covering places in and near Red Cloud that contributed to Cather's upbringing and works.

== History ==
The Burlington Depot was constructed by the Burlington and Missouri River Railroad, a company founded in Iowa. The federal government had encouraged the construction of railroad lines in Nebraska during the 1860s, offering a land grant aid to the Burlington and Missouri Railroad in 1864. However, due to the ongoing Civil War and the halt of other construction on the railroad, the Burlington and Missouri Railroad did not expand into Nebraska until 1870. Two years later, the railroad connected with the Union Pacific Railroad at Kearney, but in the next few years it would lay even more track across Nebraska. As the population increased in the Republican Valley (particularly in Bloomington, Red Cloud, Republican City, Alma City, and Arapahoe), the Burlington and Missouri Railroad came to believe that the area could support a railroad line and began further construction in 1878, the new line reaching Red Cloud in November of that year. Since its construction in 1897, the building and its surrounding rails have been subject to floods and fires.

== Restoration ==
In 1965, the railroad sold the depot to a salvage company, whose owner (V. H. Fette of McCook) donated the building to the Willa Cather Foundation (then the Willa Cather Pioneer Memorial). Financially, it was a big project to take on since the depot had to be moved away from the tracks due to safety regulations and because it was in need of restoration. But many people were determined to make the depot, a place that served as inspiration in many of Willa Cather's works, accessible to the public. Efforts spanned across Nebraska, beginning with V. H. Fette's donation of the original building, then Mr. and Mrs. Ralph Makinster's (Red Cloud) gift of land for the depot's new site, Mr. and Mrs. John Quirk's (Hastings) grant of $5,000, and the assistance of many others.

After a foundation was poured at the new site, as much of the depot as could be saved was brought to its new home. The understructure had rotted, but the bricks of the platform and half of the tile on the floor in the waiting room were incorporated into the restoration. Original floor plans were used to make the building as authentic as possible. Soon, the Willa Cather Foundation realized more funds would be needed to complete the Burlington Depot: an estimated $11,750 in adjusting the walls, adding and repairing tin shingles, moving the staircase, removing and reapplying paint一among many other restoration efforts. Like many of the Burlington Railroad depots, the restored depot in Red Cloud was painted Burlington red, bringing color to the prairie in the winter that Willa Cather often described as a drab and dull monotony of tones. Helen Obitz, one of the founders of the Willa Cather Foundation and an antique collector, helped to furnish the Burlington Depot, supplying such items as a potbellied heating stove, a few railroad lanterns, and a Pullman stool. In 1969, a $25,000 grant from the Wood Charitable Fund was given to the Willa Cather Foundation for the Burlington Depot and for St. Juliana Falconieri Catholic Church. A year later, on April 18, dedication ceremonies celebrated the opening of both sites. Fred B. Deines, then a vice president of the Burlington Railroad, cut the ribbon for the newly restored Burlington Depot.

In an issue of the Willa Cather Review (10.1), hope was expressed that the Burlington Depot would last eighty years or more. Today it is still standing, though restoration efforts recommenced in 2020.

== Willa Cather ==
The Cather family came to Red Cloud via the railroad in 1883, when Willa Cather was 10. At the time the depot was a busy place, with eight passenger trains stopping each day and freights coming around day and night. Willa Cather enjoyed going to the depot with her friends and family for entertainment, walking down Red Cloud's wooden sidewalk—extending a mile from the center of town (the stairs down can still be seen today, though the rest of the boardwalk is gone). The activity of this depot, a source of entertainment in Willa's early life, became a prevailing inspiration in her works. Mildred R. Bennett, first president of the Willa Cather Pioneer Memorial, remarked that "Willa’s great emotional involvement with the railroad is in practically everything she wrote. ... To her the whistle of the train was a call to adventure."
