= First Baptist Church (Red Cloud, Nebraska) =

- U.S. National Register of Historic Places
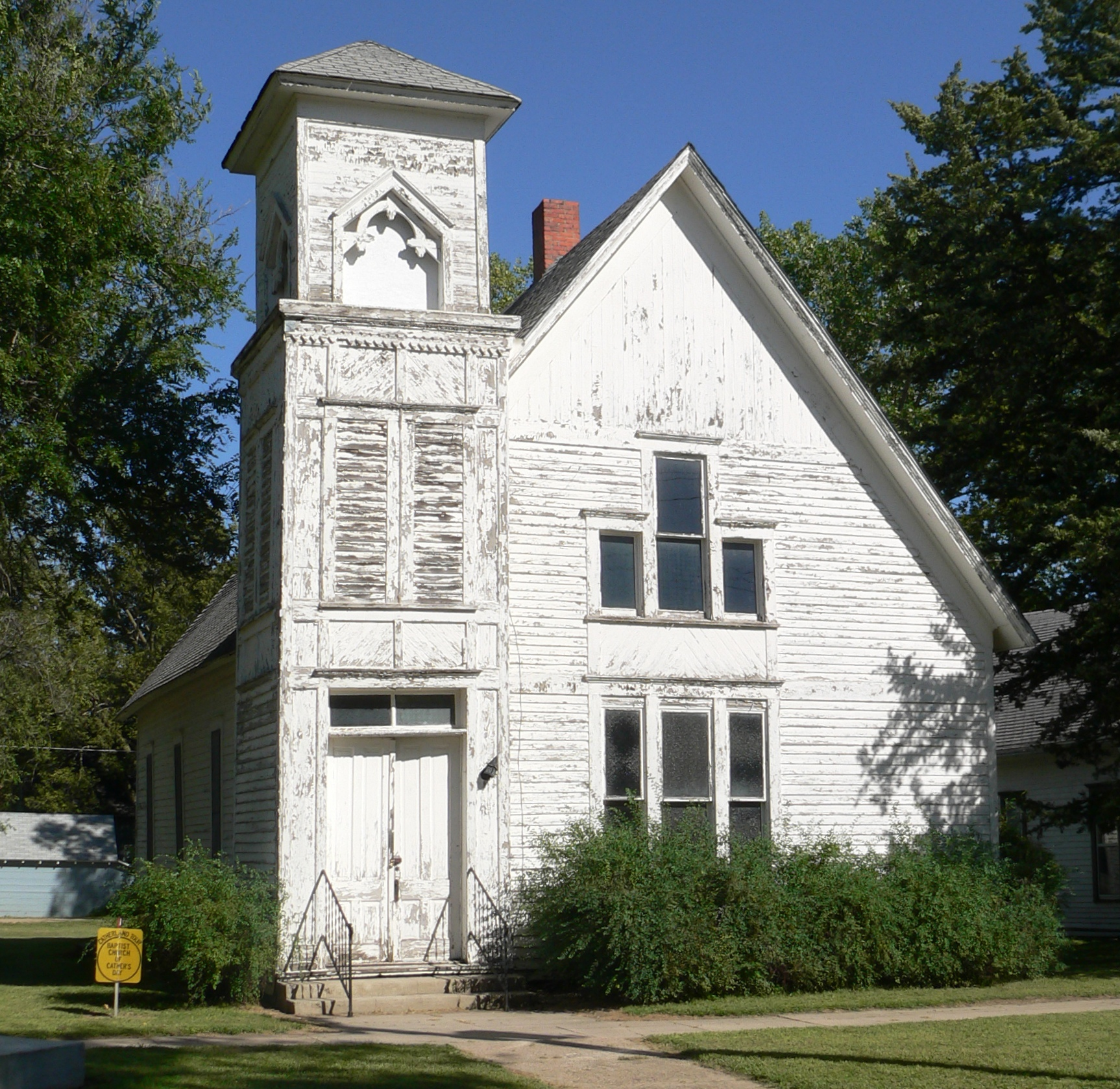
- The church in 2010

- Location within Nebraska Location within the United States
- Location: 442 North Seward Street, Red Cloud, Nebraska
- Coordinates: 40°05′23″N 98°31′17″W
- Area: less than one acre
- Built: 1883
- MPS: Willa Cather TR
- NRHP reference No.: 82003206
- Added to NRHP: August 12, 1982

The First Baptist Church is a historic church building in Red Cloud, Nebraska. It was built in 1884 thanks to the American Baptist Home Mission Society. Author Willa Cather grew up attending this church with her parents, and she wrote about it in her 1915 novel, The Song of the Lark. It has been listed on the National Register of Historic Places since August 12, 1982.
