= George Cather Farmstead =

- Cather, George, Farmstead
- U.S. National Register of Historic Places
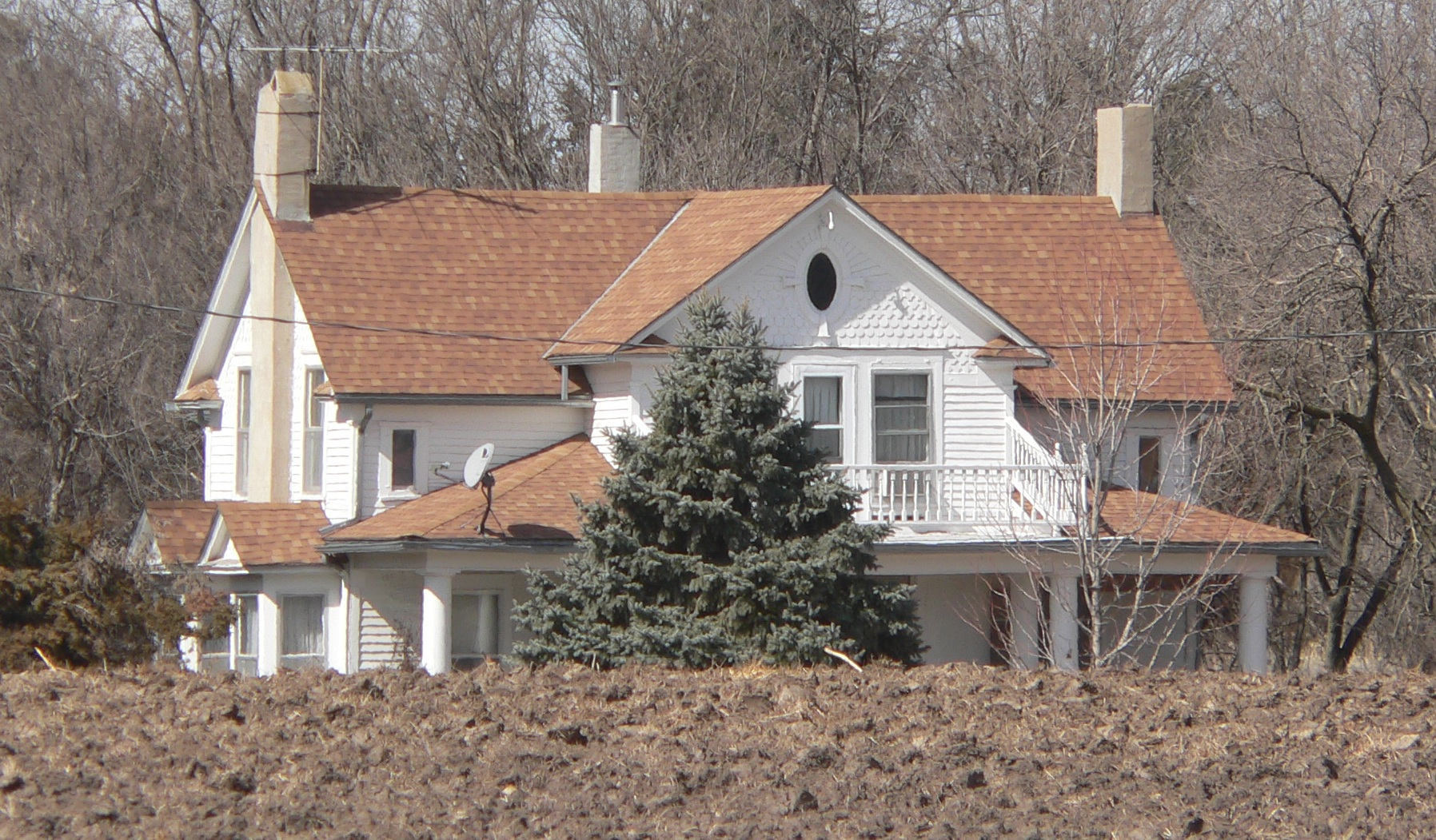
- The farm in 2012

- Location within Nebraska Location within the United States
- Nearest city: Bladen, Nebraska
- Coordinates: 40°14′57″N 98°38′27″W
- Area: 9.9 acres (4.0 ha)
- Built: 1885
- Architectural style: VA Tidewater I-type
- MPS: Willa Cather TR
- NRHP reference No.: 82004917
- Added to NRHP: August 11, 1982

The George Cather Farmstead is a historic farm in Bladen, Nebraska. It was built in 1885 for George P. Gather and his wife Frances, whose niece was Willa Cather, a novelist and short-story writer. Cather used her aunt as inspiration for Aunt Georgiana in her 1904 short story, A Wagner Matinee, and she drew inspiration from the farm itself for her 1923 novel, One of Ours. Aside from the main farmhouse, more outbuildings were constructed up until the 1920s. George Cather died in 1938. The property has been listed on the National Register of Historic Places since August 11, 1982.
