= Cathers =

Cathers may refer to:

== Surname ==
- Brad Cathers, Canadian politician in Yukon
- Cecil Cathers, Canadian politician in Ontario

== See also ==
- Earle Cathers Westwood (1909-1980), Canadian politician in BC
- Cather
