= George Bentley House =

Historic house in Worcester, Massachusetts, USA

- U.S. National Register of Historic Places
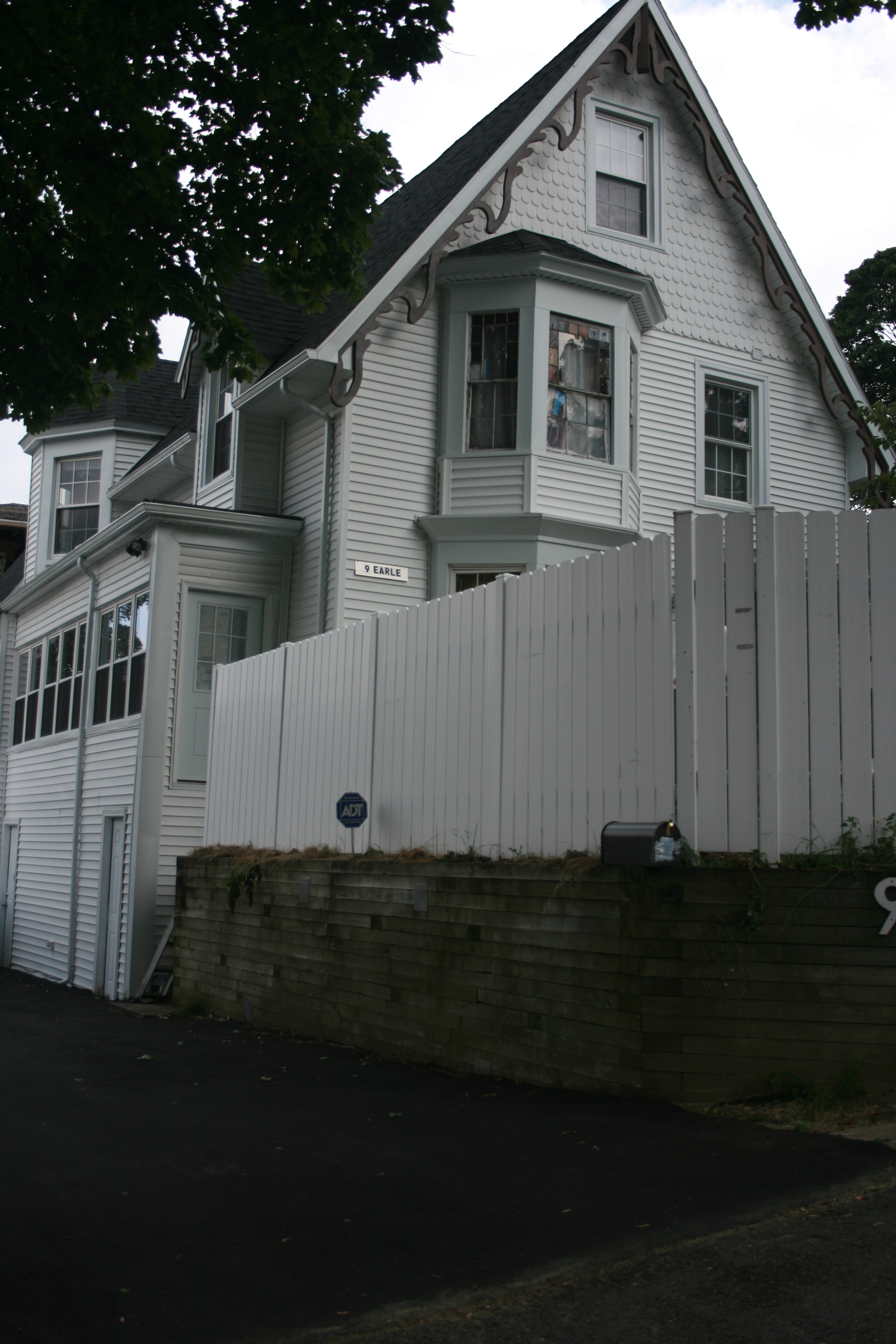

- Location within Massachusetts Location within the United States
- Location: 9 Earle St., Worcester, Massachusetts
- Coordinates: 42°16′16″N 71°47′29″W
- Area: less than one acre
- Built: 1849
- Architect: Bartlett, John
- Architectural style: Carpenter Gothic
- MPS: Worcester MRA
- NRHP reference No.: 80000560
- Added to NRHP: March 05, 1980

The George Bentley House is a historic house at 9 Earle Street in Worcester, Massachusetts. Built in 1849–50, this 1 1/2-story wood-frame cottage is Worcester's finest surviving example of Carpenter Gothic styling. It was listed on the National Register of Historic Places in 1980.

== Description and history ==
The George Bentley House is located in a residential area east of downtown Worcester, on the south side of Earle Street between Edward and Elizabeth Streets. It is a 1 1/2-story wood-frame structure, mostly finished in modern siding. It has a steeply pitched gable roof with original bargeboard in the eaves, a bracketed hood over its front entry, and a side porch with elaborate woodwork trim and chamfered posts. The windows have decorative hood molding, and there are gabled dormers projecting from the roof faces. The left bay of the front facade has a two-story polygonal projecting bay. Later in the 19th century, Queen Anne-style scale shingle treatment was added to its gables.

The house was built in 1849–50 by John Barrett, who purchased the empty lot in 1849, and sold it, with house standing, the following year to George Bentley and Daniel Jackson. Bentley and Jackson were listed as clerks working for the Nashua Railroad. The house is a typical example of the type of housing built during the early suburbanization of the area in the 1850s, and is one of its only survivors. Its later alterations, mainly the addition of scale shingles and the raising of the front bay, do not detract from its Gothic features, but some have been lost by the application of modern siding.

== See also ==
- National Register of Historic Places listings in eastern Worcester, Massachusetts
