= Melius-Bentley House =

Historic house in New York, United States

- U.S. National Register of Historic Places
- Location within New York Location within the United States
- Nearest city: N of Pine Plains on Mt. Ross Rd., Ancram, New York and Pine Plains, New York
- Coordinates: 42°0′19″N 73°42′36″W
- Area: 24.8 acres (10.0 ha)
- Built: 1717
- Architectural style: Federal, Hudson Valley frame
- NRHP reference No.: 82005024
- Added to NRHP: August 11, 1982

The Melius-Bentley House is a historic home located in the towns of Ancram, Columbia County and Pine Plains, Dutchess County, New York. It was placed on the National Register of Historic Places on August 11, 1982, and preserves several rare architectural features. The house is situated on a 24.8-acre (10.0 ha) parcel of wooded land on Mount Ross Road (County Route 50). The lot is divided by the Dutchess–Columbia County border.
