= William Cather Homestead Site =

- U.S. National Register of Historic Places
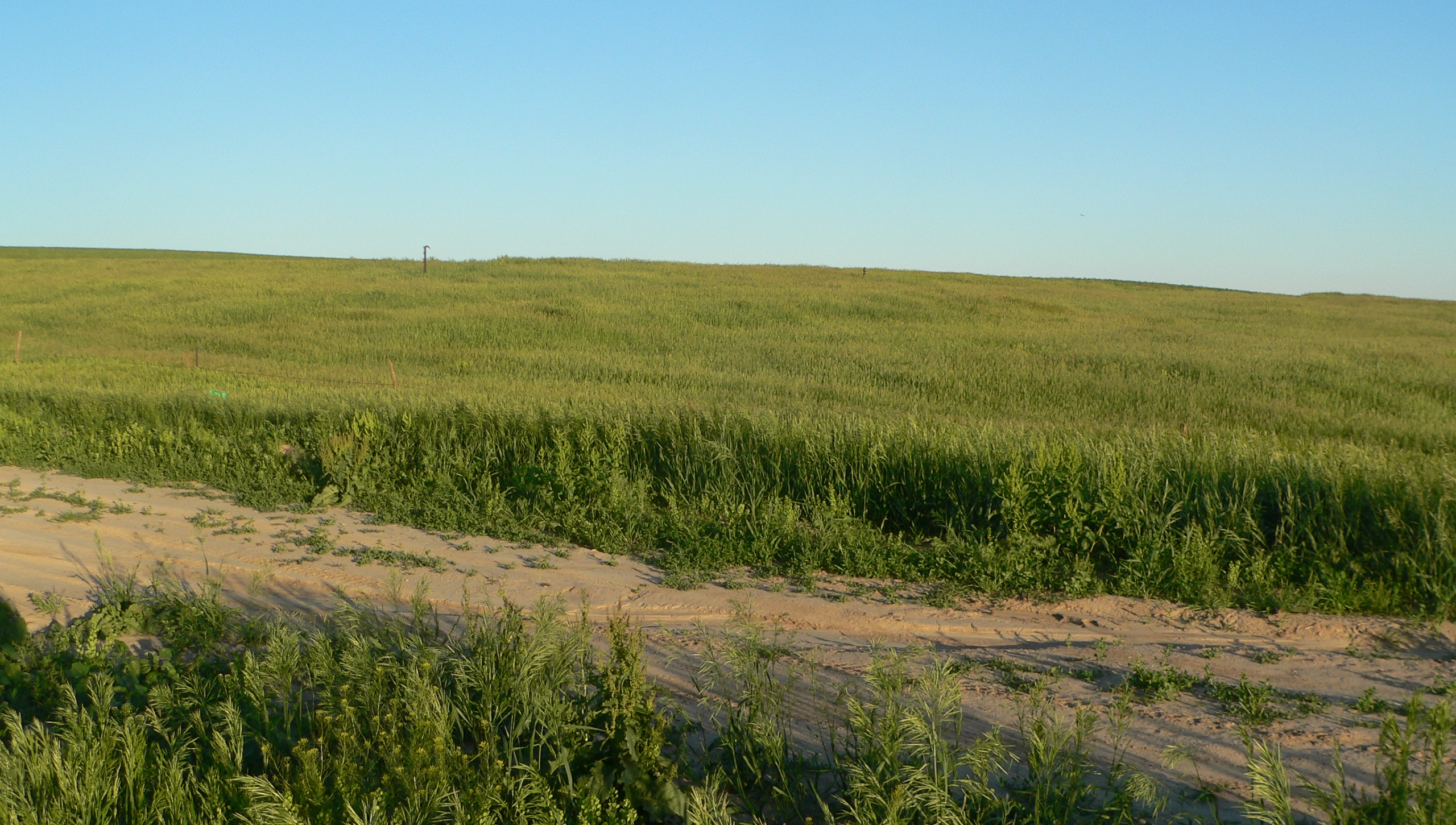

- Location within Nebraska Location within the United States
- Nearest city: Red Cloud, Nebraska
- Coordinates: 40°13′07″N 98°39′31″W
- Area: 9.9 acres (4.0 ha)
- MPS: Willa Cather TR
- NRHP reference No.: 82004921
- Added to NRHP: August 11, 1982

The William Cather Homestead Site, in Webster County, Nebraska near Red Cloud, Nebraska, was listed on the National Register of Historic Places in 1982.

The property includes the site of William Cather's homestead and the remains of housing of a pump.
