= Bladen, Nebraska =

- Village
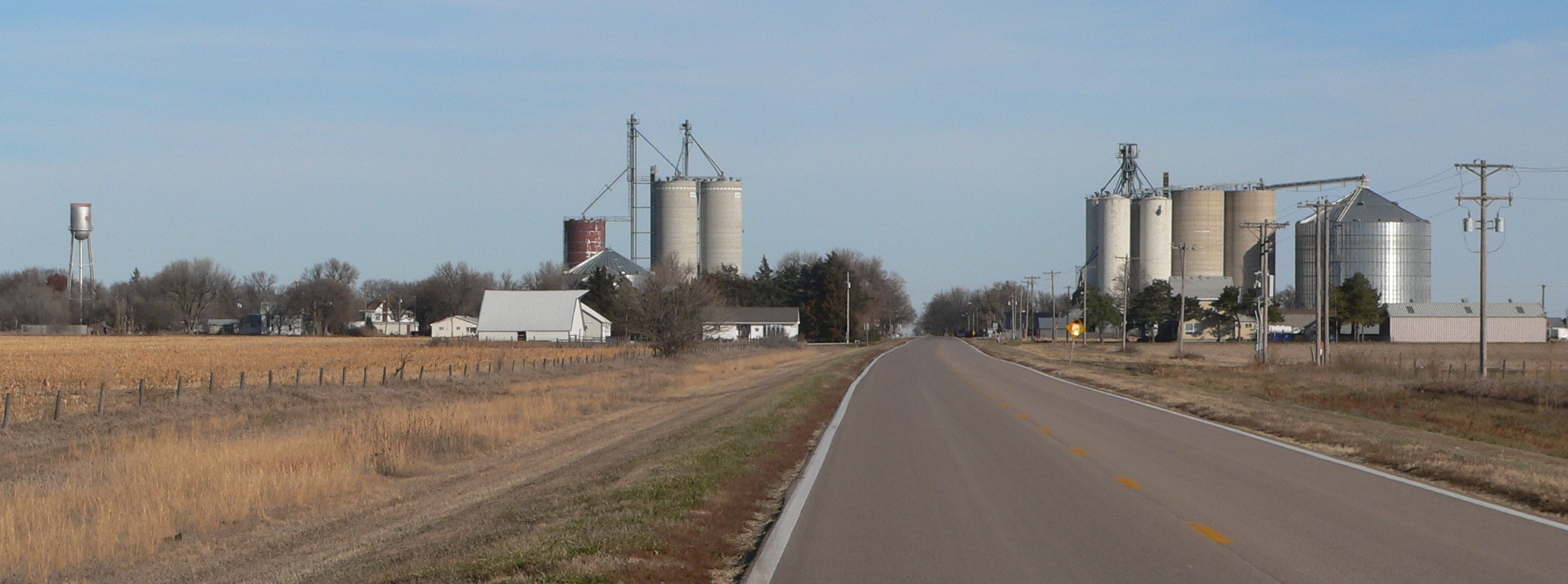
- Bladen, seen from the south along Spur 91A

- Location of Bladen, Nebraska
- Coordinates: 40°19′24″N 98°35′45″W
- Country: United States
- State: Nebraska
- County: Webster

Area
  - Total: 0.36 sq mi (0.93 km^{2})
  - Land: 0.36 sq mi (0.93 km^{2})
  - Water: 0 sq mi (0.00 km^{2})
- Elevation: 1,982 ft (604 m)

Population (2020)
  - Total: 205
  - Density: 571.7/sq mi (220.74/km^{2})
- Time zone: UTC-6 (Central (CST))
  - Summer (DST): UTC-5 (CDT)
- ZIP code: 68928
- Area code: 402
- FIPS code: 31-05140
- GNIS feature ID: 2398129

Bladen is a village in Webster County, Nebraska, United States. As of the 2020 census, Bladen had a population of 205.

== History ==
Bladen was established in 1886 when the Burlington and Missouri River Railroad was extended to that point. The community bears the name of a pioneer settler.

Bladen has been the home of the Webster County Fair since 1906.

== Geography ==
According to the United States Census Bureau, the village has a total area of 0.36 square miles (0.93 km^{2}), all land.

== Demographics ==
Historical population
Census	Pop.	Note	%±
1910	494		—
1920	445		−9.9%
1930	448		0.7%
1940	272		−39.3%
1950	282		3.7%
1960	322		14.2%
1970	293		−9.0%
1980	298		1.7%
1990	280		−6.0%
2000	291		3.9%
2010	237		−18.6%
2020	205		−13.5%
U.S. Decennial Census

=== 2010 census ===
As of the census of 2010, there were 237 people, 93 households, and 65 families residing in the village. The population density was 658.3 inhabitants per square mile (254.2/km^{2}). There were 118 housing units at an average density of 327.8 per square mile (126.6/km^{2}). The racial makeup of the village was 87.3% White, 3.8% Pacific Islander, 7.6% from other races, and 1.3% from two or more races. Hispanic or Latino of any race were 9.7% of the population.

There were 93 households, of which 35.5% had children under the age of 18 living with them, 55.9% were married couples living together, 7.5% had a female householder with no husband present, 6.5% had a male householder with no wife present, and 30.1% were non-families. 25.8% of all households were made up of individuals, and 17.2% had someone living alone who was 65 years of age or older. The average household size was 2.55 and the average family size was 3.06.

The median age in the village was 41.6 years. 26.6% of residents were under the age of 18; 6.4% were between the ages of 18 and 24; 19.5% were from 25 to 44; 31.2% were from 45 to 64; and 16.5% were 65 years of age or older. The gender makeup of the village was 45.6% male and 54.4% female.

=== 2000 census ===
As of the census of 2000, there were 291 people, 112 households, and 77 families residing in the village. The population density was 813.7 inhabitants per square mile (314.2/km^{2}). There were 131 housing units at an average density of 366.3 per square mile (141.4/km^{2}). The racial makeup of the village was 98.97% White, 0.34% Asian, and 0.69% from two or more races.

There were 112 households, out of which 33.9% had children under the age of 18 living with them, 62.5% were married couples living together, 4.5% had a female householder with no husband present, and 31.3% were non-families. 29.5% of all households were made up of individuals, and 13.4% had someone living alone who was 65 years of age or older. The average household size was 2.60 and the average family size was 3.27.

In the village, the population was spread out, with 29.9% under the age of 18, 5.8% from 18 to 24, 26.5% from 25 to 44, 23.4% from 45 to 64, and 14.4% who were 65 years of age or older. The median age was 36 years. For every 100 females, there were 92.7 males. For every 100 females age 18 and over, there were 106.1 males.

As of 2000 the median income for a household in the village was $31,250, and the median income for a family was $34,375. Males had a median income of $25,909 versus $16,071 for females. The per capita income for the village was $12,052. About 4.2% of families and 6.1% of the population were below the poverty line, including 6.2% of those under the age of eighteen and 5.7% of those 65 or over.
