= Willa Cather House =

Historic house in Nebraska, United States

- U.S. National Register of Historic Places
- U.S. National Historic Landmark
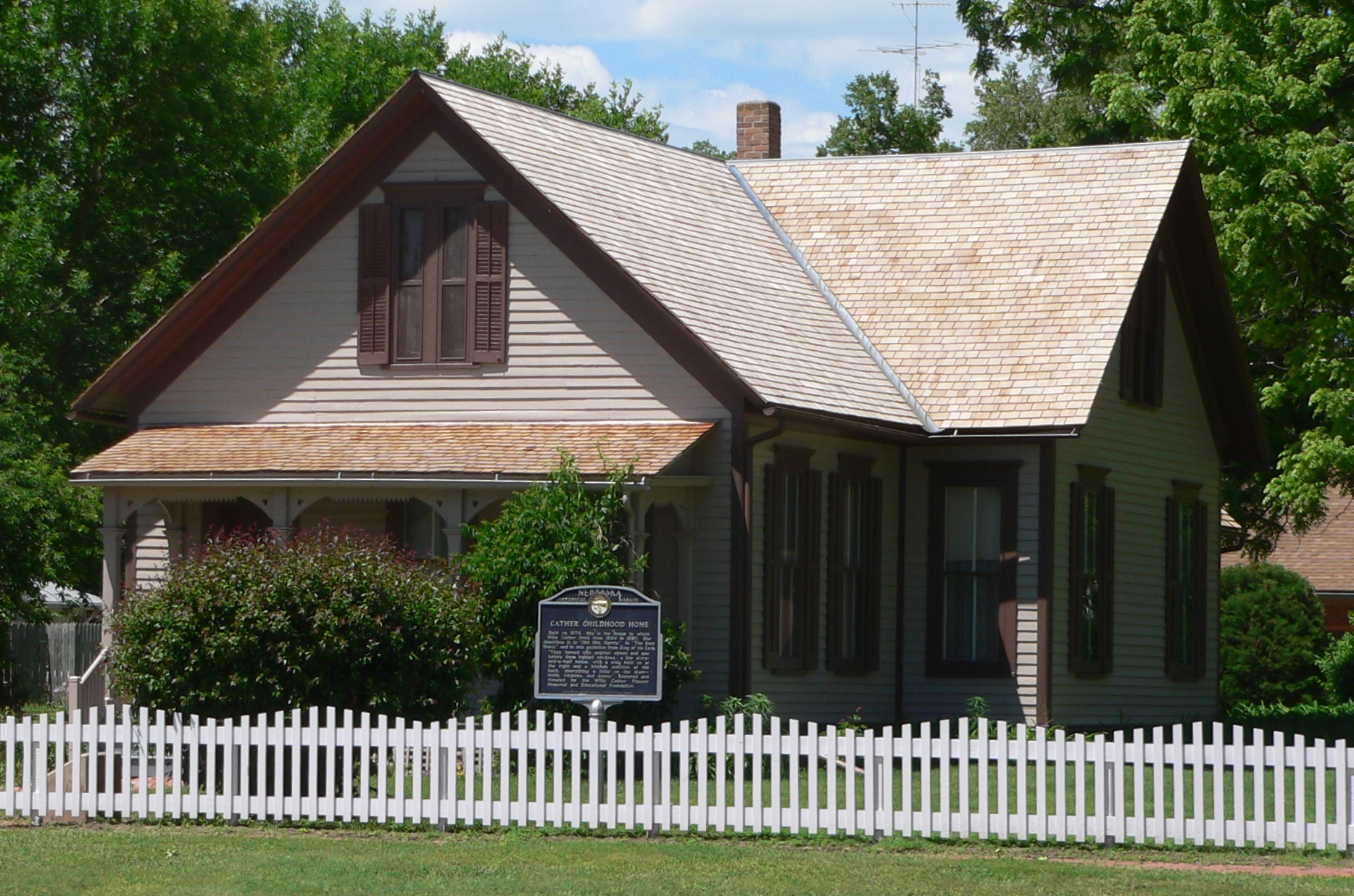
- Willa Cather house seen from east (Cedar Street)

- Location within Nebraska Location within the United States
- Location: Southwestern corner of 3rd Avenue and Cedar Street in Red Cloud, Nebraska, United States
- Coordinates: 40°5′16″N 98°31′16″W
- Area: less than one acre
- Built: 1878
- MPS: Willa Cather TR (AD)
- NRHP reference No.: 69000139

Significant dates
- Added to NRHP: April 16, 1969
- Designated NHL: November 11, 1971

The Willa Cather House, also known as the Willa Cather Childhood Home, is a historic house museum at 241 North Cedar Street in Red Cloud, Nebraska. Built in 1878, it is the house where author Willa Cather (1873–1947) grew up. Cather's descriptions of frontier life in Nebraska were an important part of the literary canon of the early 20th century. The house was declared a National Historic Landmark in 1971. The house is one of eight structures that make up the Willa Cather State Historic Site, which is owned by the Willa Cather Foundation.

== Description and history ==
The Willa Cather House is located just west of downtown Red Cloud, at the southwest corner of North Cedar Street and West 3rd Avenue. It is a 1 1/2-story wood-frame structure, with a gabled roof and clapboarded exterior. The front facade is three bays wide, with the entrance in the leftmost bay. A single-story shed-roof porch extends across the front, supported by square wooden posts with a decorative woodwork valance between them. The interior is organized with a parlor in front, a dining room and master bedroom behind, and a kitchen and a second bedroom at the rear. A narrow stair from the kitchen to the attic is a reconstruction. The rear bedroom was described by Willa Cather as "grandmother's room" in "Old Mrs. Harris", and the stairs lead to the loft where Cather and her siblings slept. The interior has been furnished and decorated using Cather family artifacts and period items.

The house was built in 1878. Cather's parents moved the family to this house in the spring of 1885, and Cather was resident here until she turned seventeen and left for college. Her parents remained in the house (which they rented) for some years afterward, moving elsewhere in Red Cloud in 1904. Cather was a regular visitor to the town in her lifetime. The house was purchased in 1960 by the Willa Cather Memorial and Educational Foundation, which oversaw its restoration and return to the period of Cather's occupancy. Cather described the years in which she came of age here as influential on her writing, even though most of her writing was done while she lived elsewhere.

== See also ==
- List of National Historic Landmarks in Nebraska
- National Register of Historic Places listings in Webster County, Nebraska
- List of residences of American writers
