= Red Cloud, Nebraska =

City in and county seat of Webster County, Nebraska, United States

- City
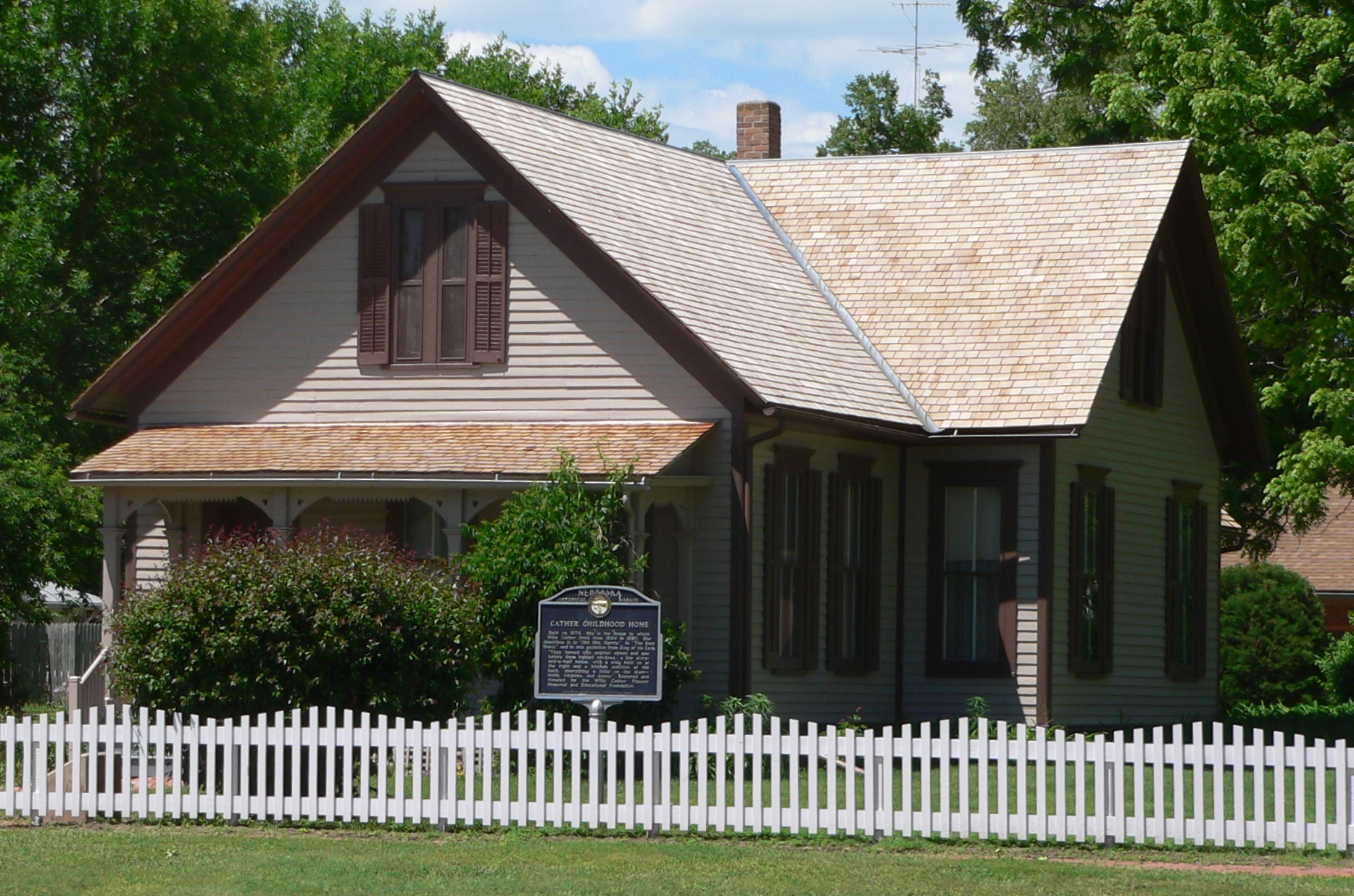
- Willa Cather's childhood home, May 2010

- Location of Red Cloud within Webster County and Nebraska
- Coordinates: 40°05′11″N 98°31′20″W
- Country: United States
- State: Nebraska
- County: Webster

Area
  - Total: 1.03 sq mi (2.66 km^{2})
  - Land: 1.03 sq mi (2.66 km^{2})
  - Water: 0 sq mi (0.00 km^{2})
- Elevation: 1,716 ft (523 m)

Population (2020)
  - Total: 962
  - Density: 936.3/sq mi (361.51/km^{2})
- Time zone: UTC-6 (Central (CST))
  - Summer (DST): UTC-5 (CDT)
- ZIP Code: 68970
- Area code: 402
- FIPS code: 31-40920
- GNIS feature ID: 2396335
- Website: www.visitredcloud.com

Red Cloud is a city in and the county seat of Webster County, Nebraska, United States. The population was 962 at the 2020 census.

== History ==
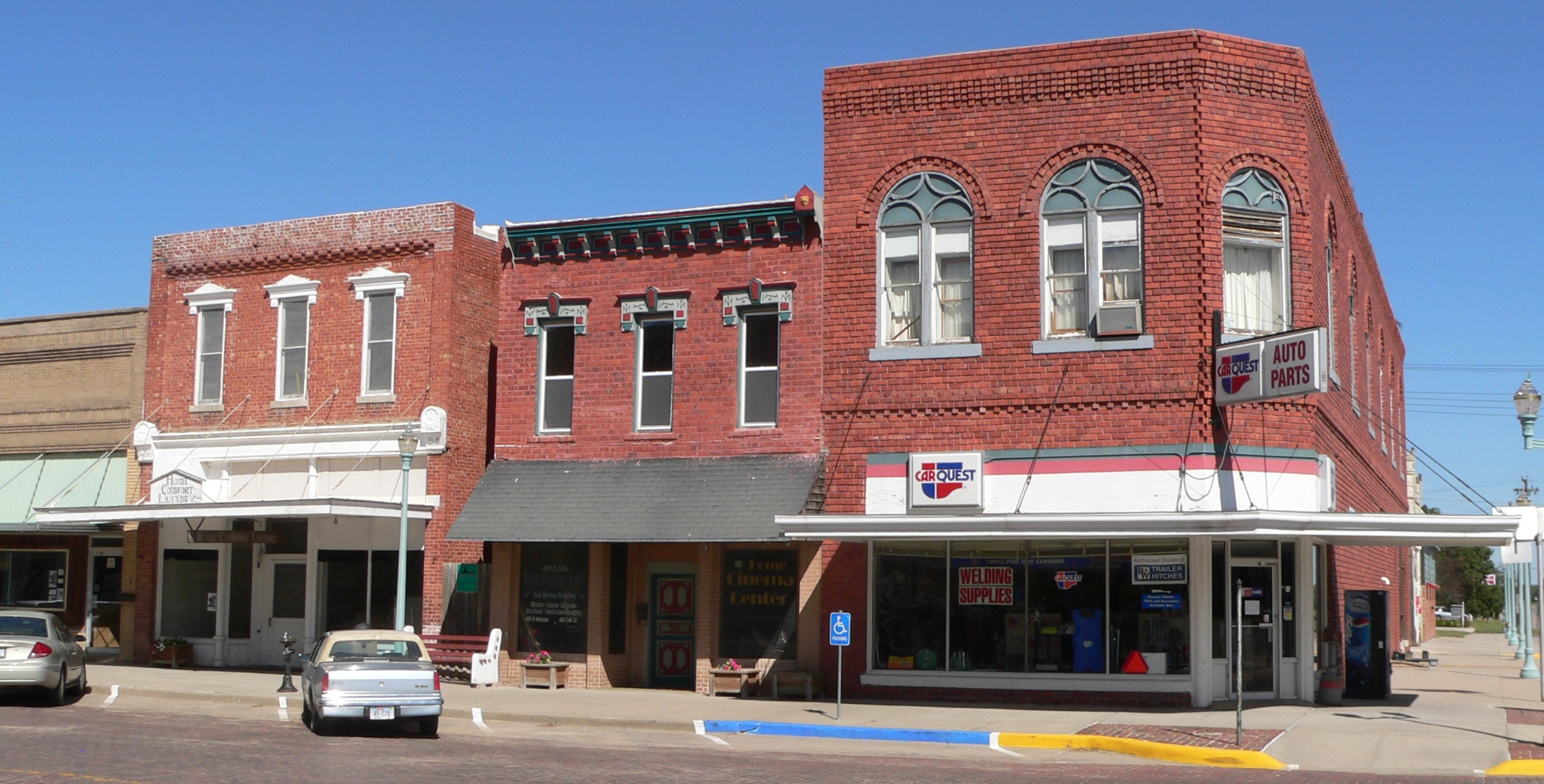
Main Street Historic District

The region of present-day Red Cloud was intermittently occupied and used as hunting grounds by the Pawnees until 1833. In that year, a treaty was signed in which the Pawnees surrendered their lands south of the Platte River. According to George Hyde, it is likely that the Pawnees did not realize that they were thereby giving up their lands, and that they were led to believe that they were only granting the Delawares and other relocated tribes permission to hunt in the area.

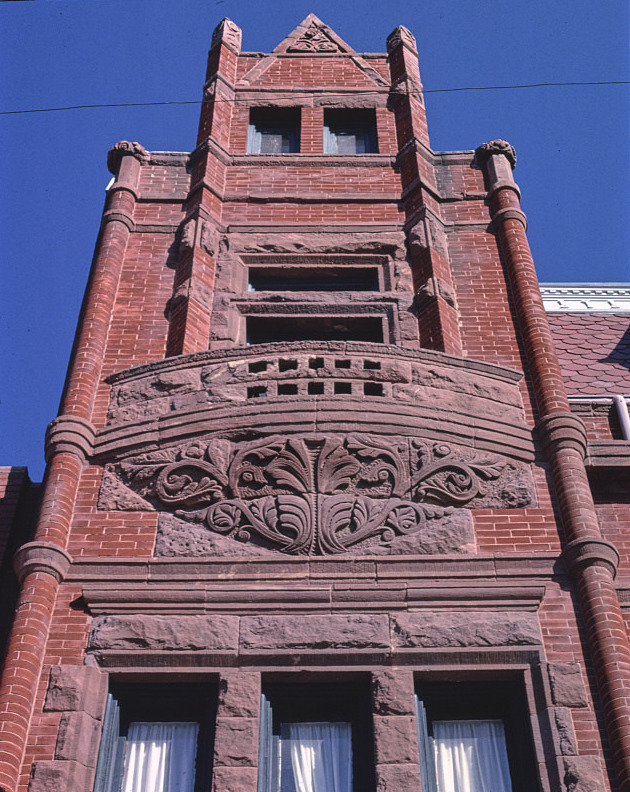
Farmers' and Merchants' Bank building (1889), in Red Cloud, now property of the Willa Cather Foundation

In 1870, the area that is now Webster County was opened to homesteaders. In that year, Silas Garber and other settlers filed claims along Crooked Creek, just east of the present-day city. In 1871, the town, named after the renowned Oglala Lakota leader Red Cloud, was voted county seat of the newly formed county. The city was platted in 1872.

The author Willa Cather lived in Red Cloud with her family for seven years, starting in 1883 at age nine, and later visited often. She used the town as inspiration for several in her novels, including Black Hawk in My Ántonia. Early articles by Cather were published in the city's first newspaper, The Red Cloud Chief. Several 19th-century buildings described in her books are part of the Willa Cather Historic District, the largest district dedicated to an author listed in the National Register of Historic Places. Her childhood home is also part of the district.

== Geography ==
According to the United States Census Bureau, the city has a total area of 1.02 square miles (2.64 km^{2}), all land.

=== Climate ===
Climate data for Red Cloud, Nebraska (1991–2020 normals, extremes 1901–present)
Month	Jan	Feb	Mar	Apr	May	Jun	Jul	Aug	Sep	Oct	Nov	Dec	Year
Record high °F (°C)	77 (25)	83 (28)	98 (37)	100 (38)	106 (41)	113 (45)	117 (47)	113 (45)	110 (43)	100 (38)	84 (29)	80 (27)	117 (47)
Mean daily maximum °F (°C)	37.3 (2.9)	41.8 (5.4)	53.6 (12.0)	64.2 (17.9)	74.1 (23.4)	85.6 (29.8)	90.5 (32.5)	87.9 (31.1)	80.2 (26.8)	66.8 (19.3)	52.2 (11.2)	40.0 (4.4)	64.5 (18.1)
Daily mean °F (°C)	24.9 (−3.9)	28.7 (−1.8)	39.4 (4.1)	49.8 (9.9)	60.8 (16.0)	72.2 (22.3)	77.2 (25.1)	74.7 (23.7)	65.6 (18.7)	52.1 (11.2)	38.3 (3.5)	27.7 (−2.4)	50.9 (10.5)
Mean daily minimum °F (°C)	12.5 (−10.8)	15.6 (−9.1)	25.1 (−3.8)	35.4 (1.9)	47.4 (8.6)	58.8 (14.9)	64.0 (17.8)	61.4 (16.3)	51.1 (10.6)	37.3 (2.9)	24.5 (−4.2)	15.4 (−9.2)	37.4 (3.0)
Record low °F (°C)	−28 (−33)	−30 (−34)	−22 (−30)	4 (−16)	20 (−7)	27 (−3)	38 (3)	36 (2)	20 (−7)	2 (−17)	−13 (−25)	−36 (−38)	−36 (−38)
Average precipitation inches (mm)	0.52 (13)	0.65 (17)	1.25 (32)	2.22 (56)	4.19 (106)	3.61 (92)	3.88 (99)	3.38 (86)	1.96 (50)	1.98 (50)	1.11 (28)	0.71 (18)	25.46 (647)
Average snowfall inches (cm)	4.9 (12)	5.6 (14)	2.4 (6.1)	0.8 (2.0)	0.0 (0.0)	0.0 (0.0)	0.0 (0.0)	0.0 (0.0)	0.0 (0.0)	0.8 (2.0)	1.1 (2.8)	3.0 (7.6)	18.6 (47)
Average precipitation days (≥ 0.01 in)	3.1	3.2	4.4	6.3	8.8	8.5	7.6	6.5	4.7	5.1	3.6	2.9	64.7
Average snowy days (≥ 0.1 in)	2.8	2.7	1.2	0.3	0.0	0.0	0.0	0.0	0.0	0.2	0.8	2.2	10.2
Source: NOAA

== Demographics ==
Historical population
Census	Pop.	Note	%±
1880	677		—
1890	1,839		171.6%
1900	1,554		−15.5%
1910	1,686		8.5%
1920	1,856		10.1%
1930	1,519		−18.2%
1940	1,610		6.0%
1950	1,744		8.3%
1960	1,525		−12.6%
1970	1,531		0.4%
1980	1,300		−15.1%
1990	1,204		−7.4%
2000	1,131		−6.1%
2010	1,020		−9.8%
2020	962		−5.7%
U.S. Decennial Census

=== 2010 census ===
As of the census of 2010, there were 1,020 people, 480 households, and 267 families living in the city. The population density was 1,000 inhabitants per square mile (386.1/km^{2}). There were 594 housing units at an average density of 582.4 per square mile (224.9/km^{2}). The racial makeup of the city was 95.5% White, 0.8% African American, 0.3% Native American, 0.4% Asian, 1.2% from other races, and 1.9% from two or more races. Hispanic or Latino of any race were 4.3% of the population.

There were 480 households, of which 22.7% had children under the age of 18 living with them, 43.1% were married couples living together, 8.8% had a female householder with no husband present, 3.8% had a male householder with no wife present, and 44.4% were non-families. 40.0% of all households were made up of individuals, and 24.6% had someone living alone who was 65 years of age or older. The average household size was 2.04 and the average family size was 2.73.

The median age in the city was 50.5 years. 20.3% of residents were under the age of 18; 6.3% were between the ages of 18 and 24; 15.2% were from 25 to 44; 27.1% were from 45 to 64; and 31.2% were 65 years of age or older. The gender makeup of the city was 45.8% male and 54.2% female.

=== 2000 census ===
As of the census of 2000, there were 1,131 people, 520 households, and 302 families living in the city. The population density was 1,108 inhabitants per square mile (428/km^{2}). There were 618 housing units at an average density of 605.7 per square mile (233.9/km^{2}). The racial makeup of the city was 97.35% White, 0.18% African American, 0.97% Asian, 0.18% from other races, and 1.33% from two or more races. Hispanic or Latino of any race were 0.97% of the population.

There were 520 households, out of which 24.2% had children under the age of 18 living with them, 48.5% were married couples living together, 6.7% had a female householder with no husband present, and 41.9% were non-families. 39.4% of all households were made up of individuals, and 23.8% had someone living alone who was 65 years of age or older. The average household size was 2.09 and the average family size was 2.78.

The median age in the city was 47 years. 22.3% of the population was under the age of 18; 3.8% were between 18 and 24 years old; 21.0% were from 25 to 44; 22.5% were from 45 to 64; and 30.4% were 65 years old or older. For every 100 females, there were 89.4 males. For every 100 females age 18 and over, there were 82.4 males.

The median income for a household in the city was $26,389, and the median income for a family was $34,038. Males had a median income of $26,364 versus $17,232 for females. The per capita income for the city was $14,772. About 8.4% of families and 13.3% of the population were below the poverty line, including 20.9% of those under age 18 and 10.1% of those age 65 or over.

== Education ==
Its school district is Red Cloud Community Schools.

== Recreation ==
The city owns and operates a swimming pool in its park, and it maintains a nine-hole golf course that is claimed to be the third-best such course in the state.

== Notable people ==
- Willa Cather, Pulitzer Prize-winning writer
- Silas Garber, governor of Nebraska
- Gilbert E. McKeeby, Nebraska and Wisconsin state legislator
- William A. McKeighan, member of the United States House of Representatives
- William Norris, computer pioneer
- Les Seiler, Nebraska legislator
- Robert T. Smith, flight leader and ace with the American Volunteer Group
- Donald Stratton, USS Arizona survivor.

== In popular culture ==
In media, Red Cloud is depicted as the hometown of attorney Kim Wexler on the legal crime drama Better Call Saul.

== See also ==
- List of municipalities in Nebraska
- National Register of Historic Places listings in Webster County, Nebraska
