= George Nwangwu =

Nigerian lawyer

Extraordinary Professor of Law at Stellenbosch University
- In office 2023–Present

Personal details
- Born: George Anachebe Nwangwu Lagos, Nigeria
- Education: University of Lagos; University College London; University of Hull; University of Oxford
- Occupation: Lawyer, accountant, academic and investor

George Anachebe Nwangwu is a Nigerian lawyer, accountant, academic and investor. He is an Extraordinary Professor of Law at Stellenbosch University, South Africa, and was previously with Nile University of Nigeria until 2025.

He is the co-founder of North South Power Company Limited, which holds concessions of the Shiroro Hydroelectric Power Station and Gurara Hydroelectric Dam in Nigeria. He also founded Universal Elysium Consortium Ltd, which holds concessions in the agriculture and port sectors and founded Pragmatic Palms Products Limited, which owns the majority stake in Enugu United Palms Products Limited.

Nwangwu has held research affiliations with Stellenbosch University in South Africa and University College London in England, and served as a Senior Fellow at Harvard Kennedy School's Mossavar-Rahmani Center for Business and Government.

== Education ==
Nwangwu studied law at the University of Lagos. He later obtained a Master of Laws (LL.M.) from University College London and a PhD in Law from the University of Hull. He also completed a Master of Business Administration at the University of Oxford in 2016.

Nwangwu is also a triple chartered accountant with the CIMA in UK, the ICAN, and the ANAN in Nigeria.

== Career ==
Nwangwu began his academic career teaching in the Department of Commercial Law at the University of Lagos and at the University of London (external program).

He subsequently moved into Nigeria's public sector, where he held a series of roles in privatisation and infrastructure policy. At the Bureau of Public Enterprises, he served as Environmental Legal Adviser, Infrastructure Legal Adviser, Special Assistant to the Director-General, and Head of Strategy and Multilateral Relations. He later served as Public-Private Partnerships Coordinator and Head of the PPP Division at the Nigeria Federal Ministry of Finance, and as Special Adviser to the Coordinating Minister of the Economy on infrastructure finance and public-private partnerships.

In 2019, Nwangwu was a research fellow with the African Procurement Law Unit at Stellenbosch University in South Africa. He was appointed Extraordinary Professor at Stellenbosch in 2023. At University College London, he holds an appointment as Honorary Senior Research Associate at the Bartlett School of Sustainable Construction.

In 2024, Nwangwu served as a Senior Fellow at Harvard Kennedy School's Mossavar-Rahmani Center for Business and Government. He also holds a professorial appointment at Nile University of Nigeria, where he teaches energy policy.

== Ventures ==
In 2012, Nwangwu co-founded North South Power Company Limited, concessionaires of the Shiroro Hydroelectric Power Station and Gurara hydroelectric dam. He founded Universal Elysium Consortium ltd, which holds concessions in the agriculture and port sectors in Nigeria and founded Pragmatic Palms Products Limited, which owns the majority stake in Enugu United Palms Products Limited.

He is also the Director General of the Global Center for Law, Business and Economy in Nigeria which annually hosts the Africa Climate Forum.

Since 2007, Nwangwu is a managing partner of Ratio Consulting Ltd. He serves as a non-executive director at First Icon Mutual Capital Limited and Rasmal Capital, and holds board level positions in power-sector companies including Transgrid Enerco and Eko DisCo.

== Selected publications ==
- "The Legal Framework for Public-Private Partnerships (PPPs) in Nigeria: Untangling the Complex Web." European Procurement & Public Private Partnership Law Review, 2012.
- Public Private Partnerships in Nigeria. Palgrave Macmillan, 2016.
- "Legal Analysis of the Procurement of Privately Financed Infrastructure Projects in Nigeria." European Procurement & Public Private Partnership Law Review, 2018.
- "Stakeholder Opposition Risk in Public-Private Partnerships." International Journal of Economics and Financial Research, 2019.
- "Risk Allocation and Mitigation in Nigeria's Privatisation Programme: A Case Study of Electric Power Sector Privatisation." Journal of Power and Energy Engineering, 2021.
- "Addressing the Impacts of the COVID-19 Pandemic on Public-Private Partnership (PPP) Contracts." Journal of Sustainable Development Law and Policy, 2021.
- Legal Imperatives for the Implementation of Energy Auctions in Nigeria" (with Chidebe Matthew Nwankwo). Journal of African Law, 2025.
- Africa's Energy Transition: Pathways from Dependence to Leadership. Springer, 2025.
