= Elisa New =

American academic

Elisa (Lisa) New
- Born: 1958 (age 67–68); Philadelphia, Pennsylvania, U.S.
- Spouses: Fred David Levine (divorced; died 2013); Lawrence Summers (m. 2005)
- Children: 3

Academic background
- Education: Brandeis University (BA); Columbia University (MA, PhD)

Academic work
- Discipline: English Literature
- Sub-discipline: American literature American poetry Jewish literature
- Institutions: Arizona State University; Harvard University; University of Pennsylvania

Elisa New (born 1958) is an American academic. She was a professor of Harvard University from 1999 to 2019, and founded Poetry in America, a nonprofit PBS series that has received considerable controversy for its ties to child sex offender Jeffrey Epstein.

== Early life and education ==
She was born Jewish in Philadelphia, Pennsylvania, and raised in Maryland. New's father was an engineer and computer scientist for the National Oceanic and Atmospheric Administration and her mother worked as a party planner.

She earned a Bachelor of Arts degree from Brandeis University in 1980, as well as a Master of Arts and PhD from Columbia University in 1982 and 1988, respectively.

== Career ==
=== Academic career ===
In 1989, New joined the Department of English at the University of Pennsylvania.

In 1999, New moved to Harvard University, eventually becoming the Powell M. Cabot Professor of American Literature. While at Harvard, New developed online poetry courses in partnership with Harvard Extension School and EdX. She left Harvard in 2019.

From 2019-2025, New was the director of the Educational Media Innovation Studio at Arizona State University. In 2025, New was fired by ASU as a result of her relationship with Jeffrey Epstein.

=== Poetry in America ===
New is the creator and host of Poetry in America, a public television series which premiered in 2018. The show (and associated nonprofit, Verse Video Education), was funded in part by disgraced financier Jeffrey Epstein.

In 2016, Epstein donated $110,000 to spearhead the project. He also coordinated interviews with guests (including Woody Allen), and gave New creative input. New kept Epstein's involvement a secret from most of her staff.

In 2017, following renewed allegations that Woody Allen had sexually assaulted his adoptive daughter, the show's staff insisted that Allen's upcoming episode be pulled from the show. Facing opposition from New, they threatened to remove their names from the credits if the episode aired. New ultimately agreed to pull the episode, then wrote to Epstein in secret that she would "keep the "bootleg" episode and hope to release it someday."

In 2022, the show's presenting station, WGBH, cut ties with Poetry in America after learning of Epstein's initial financial contribution to the show. Poetry in America then moved to Arizona PBS for its fourth season.

In 2025, following evidence of Epstein's continued financial and creative involvement Poetry in America through 2019, PBS announced that it would stop distributing the show entirely, canceling its fifth season, and removing all prior seasons from its platforms.

== Association with Jeffrey Epstein ==
New met with Epstein numerous times between 2013 and 2016. Their emails were released by the House Oversight Committee in November 2025. The correspondence revealed that Epstein planned to donate $500,000 to New's Poetry in America. In 2016, Epstein donated $110,000 to Verse Video Education, New's non-profit organization which funds Poetry in America.

New and Epstein directly corresponded regarding the $500,000 donation. Following a 2023 Wall Street Journal expose, a spokesperson for the non-profit reported that New "regrets accepting funding from Epstein". According to the spokesperson, the group later made a contribution "exceeding the amount received, to a group working against sex trafficking".

In a 2019 email to Epstein, New mentioned she would reread Lolita and, separately, recommended he read My Ántonia by Willa Cather, describing both as stories of "a man whose whole life is stamped forever by his impression of a young girl".

== Personal life ==
She had three daughters with her first husband, Fred David Levine, who died in 2013. Before moving to Boston, Massachusetts, the family resided in Miami, Florida.

On December 11, 2005, she married economist Lawrence Summers. New and Summers flew with Ghislaine Maxwell to Epstein's private island during their honeymoon.

== Books ==
- The Regenerate Lyric: Theology and Innovation in American Poetry. Cambridge University Press. 1993. ISBN 978-0-521-43021-0.
- The Line's Eye: Poetic Experience, American Sight. Harvard University Press. 1999. ISBN 978-0-674-53462-9.
- Jacob's Cane: A Jewish Family's Journey from the Four lands of Lithuania to the Ports of Baltimore and London. Basic Books. 2009. ISBN 978-0-465-01525-2.
- New England Beyond Criticism: In Defense of America's First Literature. A Blackwell Manifesto: Wiley Blackwell. 2014. ISBN 978-1-118-85454-9.
