= Pavelka =

Pavelka (feminine Pavelková) is a Czech surname. Notable people include:

- Annie Sadilek Pavelka, Czech-American woman
- David Pavelka, Czech footballer
- Irena Pavelková, Czech slalom canoeist
- Jake Pavelka, American pilot
- Jaroslav Pavelka, Czech ice hockey player
- Jessie Pavelka, American fitness trainer
- Karol Pavelka, Slovak footballer
- Paul Pavelka, American aviator
- Roman Pavelka, Czech footballer
- Tomáš Pavelka, Czech ice hockey player
- Zuzana Pavelková, Czech badminton player

== See also ==
- Ed Pavelka, a character in the American TV series Prison Break
- Pavelka Farmstead, a farmstead in Nebraska
- Pawelka
