= Annie Sadilek Pavelka =

Anna (Annie) Sadilek Pavelka is best known as the real life inspiration for the character Antonia Shimerda in Willa Cather's 1918 novel, My Ántonia.

== Personal life ==
Anna Sadílková was born on 16 March 1869 in Mžižovice, Benešov district, Bohemia, Austria-Hungary (now Czech Republic) to František Sadílek and Anna (née Rybníčková), baptized Catholic within the Kozmice parish on the 18th. On 20 October 1880, her family embarked on NDL's SS Hermann in Bremen, arriving in Baltimore on 2 November 1880, en route to Red Cloud, Webster County, Nebraska, supposedly settling elsewhere in the county. In Bohemia, František was recorded as a chalupník (1/4 farmer), though Cather's novel dramatizes a transition from an alleged profession as a weaver and musician to farming. Following her father's death, Annie moved to Red Cloud, Nebraska to work with the Miner and Garber families. According to the Historical Essay in the Scholarly Edition of My Ántonia (University of Nebraska Press), Cather met Annie when she began working for Carrie and Irene Miner (the real life inspirations for Frances and Nina Harling in the novel). Cather said: "She [Annie] was one of the truest artists I ever knew in the keenness and sensitiveness of her enjoyment, in her love of people and in her willingness to take pains" (Bohlke 44).

When Annie was a young woman, she - like Antonia in the novel - returned to Webster County, pregnant, after being left by a railroad employee, James William Murphy. Back in her hometown, she gave birth to her daughter in 1892. In 1896, she married John Pavelka (Cuzak in the novel), with whom she had twelve children, three of whom died in childhood.

Cather and Annie reconnected in 1915, and they corresponded for years afterwards. In 1916, Cather made a trip to the Pavelka Farmstead, which may have been the inspiration for the final chapters of the novel, in which Jim Burden returns to Nebraska to visit Ántonia and her family. Annie Pavelka died in 1955, but her family members remain actively engaged in preserving her memory.
