= Pavelko =

Pavelko is a Ukrainian surname. Notable people with the surname include:

- Andriy Pavelko, Ukrainian politician
- Chuck Pavelko (born 1915), American football player and coach
- Oleksiy Pavelko, Ukrainian footballer

== See also ==
- {{intitle|Pavelko]]
- Pavelka

Category Ukrainian-language surnames
