= Ira Jackson =

Ira Jackson may refer to:

- Ira L. Jackson (1929-2024), American politician
- Ira A. Jackson, American director and college administrator
- Ira Jackson Jr (born 1997), English footballer
