= Keith Hennessey =

American presidential advisor

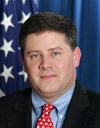

7th Director of the National Economic Council
- In office November 28, 2007 – January 20, 2009
- President: George W. Bush
- Preceded by: Al Hubbard
- Succeeded by: Larry Summers

Personal details
- Political party: Republican
- Education: Stanford University (BS); Harvard University (MPP)

Keith Hennessey is an American economist and former political advisor who served as the Assistant to the U.S. President for Economic Policy and Director of the National Economic Council. He was appointed to the position in November 2007 by President George W. Bush, and served until the end of Bush's second term in office. Hennessey had served in the White House since August 2002, when he was appointed to the position of Deputy Assistant to the President for Economic Policy and Deputy Director of the U.S. National Economic Council.

== Education ==
Hennessey holds a B.S. in Mathematics and Political Science from Stanford University and a Master of Public Policy from the John F. Kennedy School of Government at Harvard. The title of his Harvard public policy thesis was Unintended Consequences: Critical Assumptions in the Clinton Health Plan.

== Career ==
Prior to joining the White House staff, Hennessey worked for Senate Majority Leader Trent Lott from February 1997 to August 2002. While in Senator Lott's office, he was involved in the Balanced Budget Act of 1997 and all budget resolutions since 1997, the Economic Growth and Tax Relief Reconciliation Act of 2001 and all tax legislation since 1998, Trade Promotion Authority, all health legislation, the Transportation Equity Act, FAA authorization bills and many other smaller bills. Prior to joining Senator Lott, Hennessey worked as a health economist for the Senate Budget Committee, from January 1995 to February 1997. Hennessey was a research assistant for the Bipartisan Commission on Entitlement and Tax Reform from June 1994 to January 1995. From 1990 to 1992 he tested the database program Q&A for Symantec Corporation in Cupertino, California.

Since leaving the White House, Hennessey has been a television commentator and established a blog, which was named in an article reported by the Wall Street Journal economics bureau as one of the "Top 25 Economics Blogs" in 2009.

From 2009 to 2012, Hennessey worked as a research fellow at the Hoover Institution. He has since worked as a lecturer at Stanford Law School, the Stanford Graduate School of Business, and the Stanford University Public Policy Department.

Political offices
Preceded by Al Hubbard	Director of the National Economic Council; 2007–2009	Succeeded by Larry Summers
