= National Economic Council (United States) =

US federal government body chaired by the President for consideration of economic issues

The White House National Economic Council

Agency overview
- Formed: January 25, 1993
- Headquarters: Eisenhower Executive Office Building
- Employees: 25
- Agency executive: Kevin Hassett, Director
- Parent agency: Office of Policy Development, Executive Office of the President of the United States
- Website: whitehouse.gov/nec/

The National Economic Council (NEC) is the principal forum at the White House used by the president of the United States for the consideration of domestic and international economic policy matters with senior policymaking and Cabinet officials, and forms part of the Office of Policy Development which is within the Executive Office of the President of the United States.

Since the creation of the National Economic Council on January 25, 1993, its purpose is to coordinate domestic and international economic policy-making decisions, advise the president on economic policy, with respect to domestic and international economic policy matters, coordinate with various agencies across the federal government to establish consistent policy with the president's stated goals, and monitor the implementation of the economic agenda of the president.

The National Economic Council differs from the Domestic Policy Council, as it considers economic policy matters, while the Domestic Policy Council may consider anything which is related to domestic matters, with the exception of economic policy matters. It also differs from the Council of Economic Advisers, which provides research for the White House based on data, research, and evidence. The Council is also the principal arm of the president when coordinating his economic policies and goals among various other agencies.

The National Economic Council is headed by the assistant to the president for economic policy and director of the National Economic Council. Since January 20, 2025, that position has been held by Kevin Hassett.

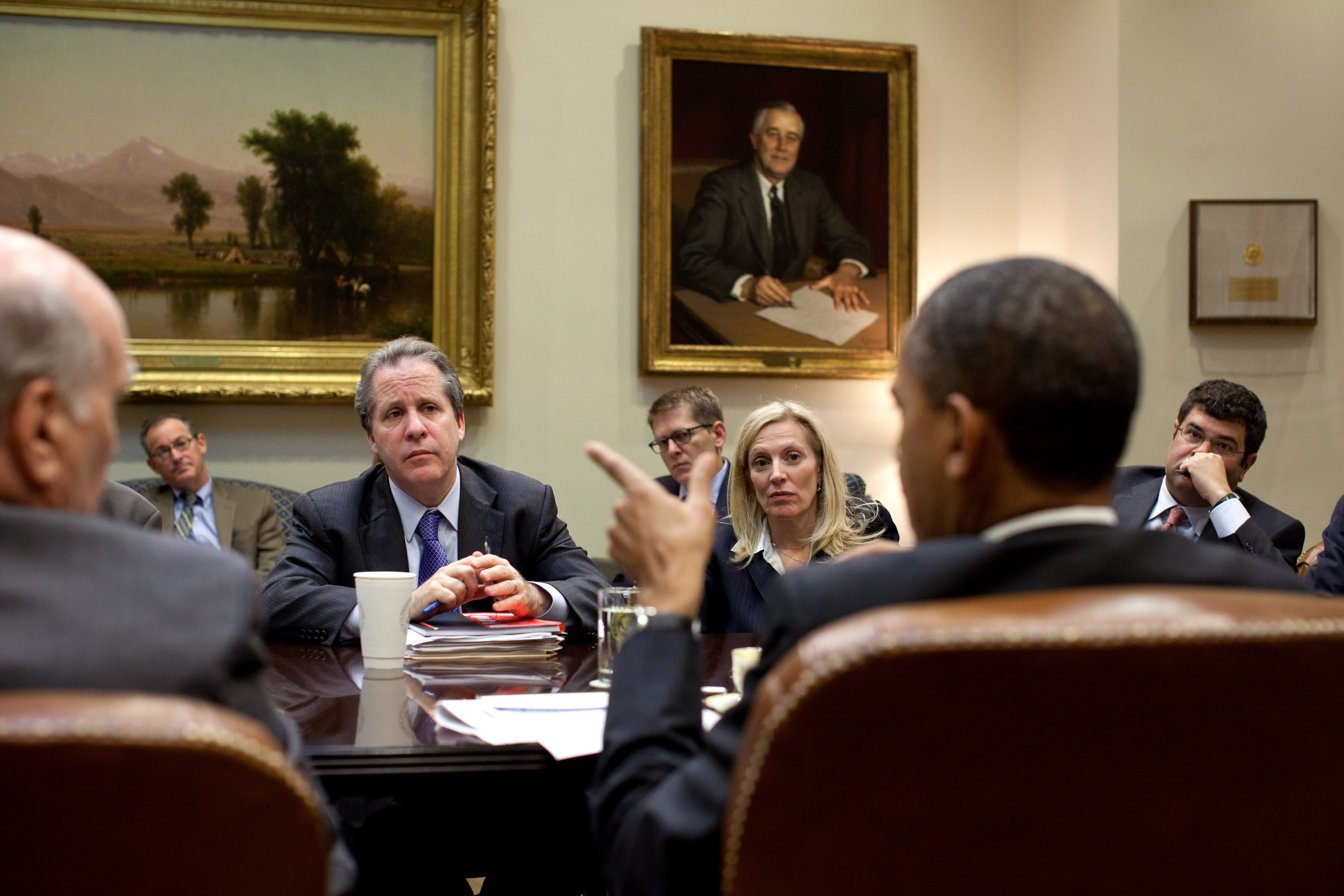
Barack Obama meets with William M. Daley, Mark Zuckerman, Gene Sperling, Lael Brainard and Neal S. Wolin, 2011

== History and mission ==
The National Economic Council was created on January 25, 1993 by Executive Order 12835 by President Bill Clinton, officially to coordinate the economic policy-making process with respect to domestic and international economic issues, coordinate economic policy advice to the president, ensure that economic policy decisions and programs are consistent with the president's stated goals, ensure that those goals are being effectively pursued, and monitor implementation of the president's economic policy agenda. Clinton appointed Robert Rubin as assistant to the president for economic policy and director of the National Economic Council on January 25, 1993, the same day as the creation of the Council. The creation of the council also fulfilled a major promise by President Bill Clinton, to make the economy of the United States a priority.

Prior to the creation of the National Economic Council, economic policy staff had existed since the 1960s. President Lyndon B. Johnson assigned a senior aide to develop and organize domestic policy, of which economic policy was included. In 1970, President Richard M. Nixon issued an executive order which created the Office of Policy Development. President Clinton split the responsibilities of the Domestic Policy Council with the National Economic Council.

The Council is considered an important tool for presidential administrations to use to achieve their domestic, and international economic goals. Robert Rubin said that the purpose for the creation of the Council was to "fix a process problem" and according to Rubin, Clinton said that he believed that he needed to find "some process instrument" which would be able to perform the role and function necessary to advance the president's agenda, and allow agencies to deliberate, coordinate, and solve matters of economic importance. Rubin states another reason Clinton established the Council was "“integrate domestic and international economic policy and. . .integrate international economic policy and so-called foreign policy.” Instead of having two domestic and international domestic staff, the council would blend the two together.

== Structure and membership ==
Additional members are added by the president of the United States, however the structure and membership of the National Economic Council, which is similar to that of the National Security Council, is as follows:

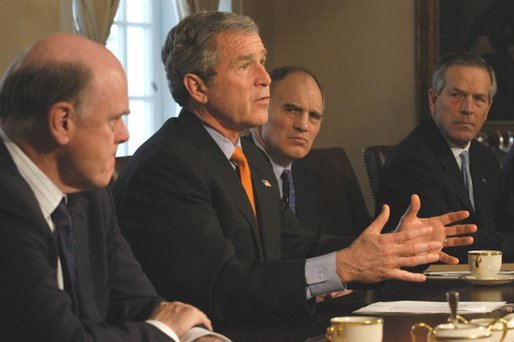
President George W. Bush meets with his economic advisors on February 25, 2003.

Structure and membership of the United States National Economic Council (As of February 2025)
Chair	Donald Trump (President)
Director	Kevin Hassett (assistant to the president for economic policy)
Deputy Director	Vacant (deputy assistant to the president and deputy director for Labor & Economy)
Deputy Director	Vacant (deputy assistant to the president and deputy director for Industrial Policy)
Deputy Director	Vacant (deputy assistant to the president and deputy director for Competition & Policy)
Deputy Director	Vacant (deputy assistant to the president and deputy director for Economic & Tax Policy)
Regular attendees	JD Vance (Vice President); Marco Rubio (Secretary of State); Scott Bessent (Secretary of the Treasury); Stephen Miran (Chair of the Council of Economic Advisers); Howard Lutnick (Secretary of Commerce); Scott Turner (Secretary of Housing and Urban Development); Sean Duffy (Secretary of Transportation); Chris Wright (Secretary of Energy); Robert F. Kennedy Jr. (Secretary of Health and Human Services)
Additional participants	Kelly Loeffler (Administrator of the Small Business Administration); Lee Zeldin (Administrator of the Environmental Protection Agency); Russ Vought (Director of the Office of Management and Budget); Jamieson Greer (United States Trade Representative); Vince Haley (Assistant to the President for Domestic Policy); Marco Rubio (acting Assistant to the President for National Security Affairs)

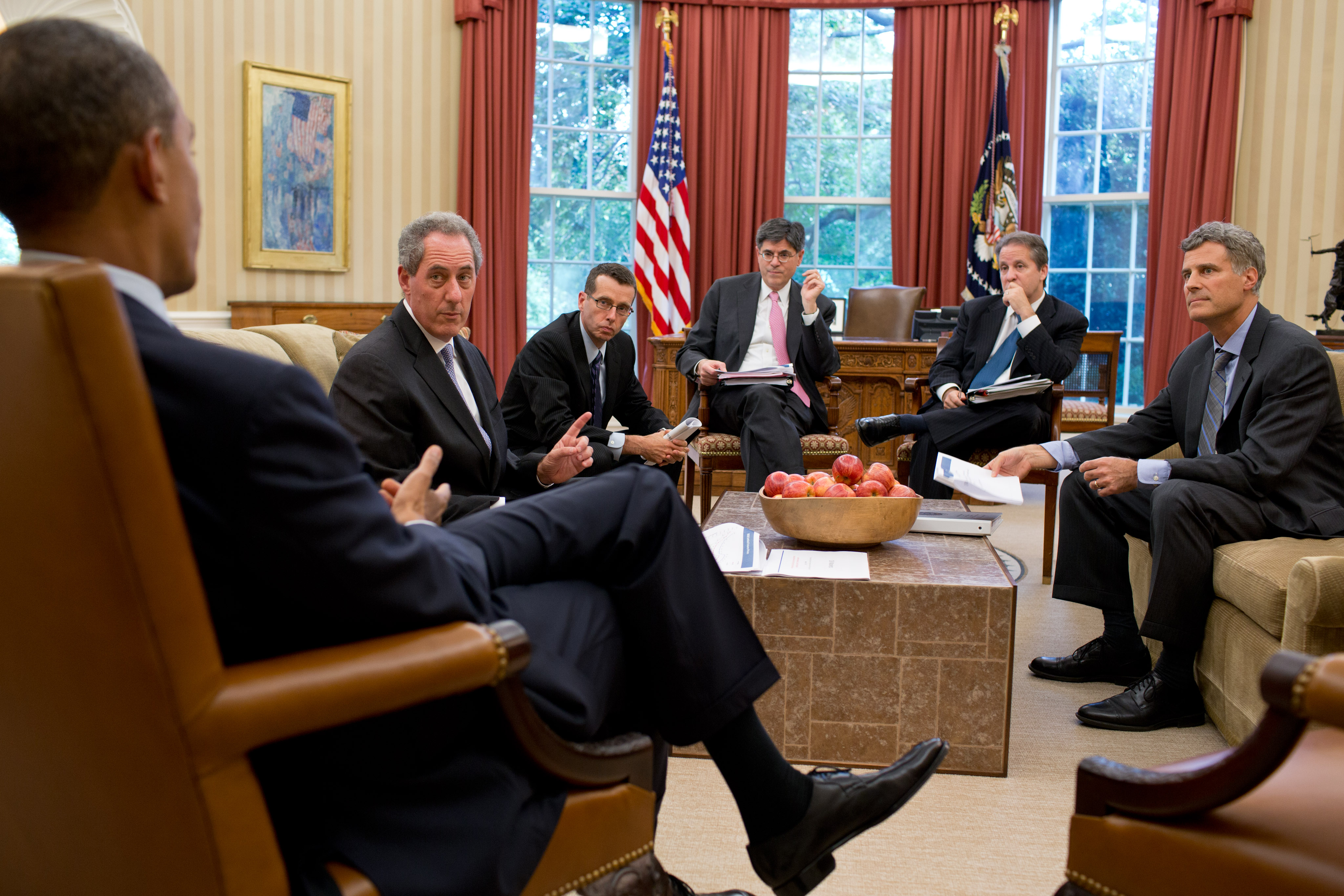
Barack Obama meets with advisors in the Oval Office, Aug. 10, 2012

== Directors of the National Economic Council ==
Image	Name	Start	End	President
	Bob Rubin	January 25, 1993	January 11, 1995	Bill Clinton (1993–2001)
	Laura Tyson	February 21, 1995	December 12, 1996	Bill Clinton (1993–2001)
	Gene Sperling	December 12, 1996	January 20, 2001	Bill Clinton (1993–2001)
	Larry Lindsey	January 20, 2001	December 12, 2002	George W. Bush (2001–2009)
	Steve Friedman	December 12, 2002	January 10, 2005	George W. Bush (2001–2009)
	Allan Hubbard	January 10, 2005	November 28, 2007	George W. Bush (2001–2009)
	Keith Hennessey	November 28, 2007	January 20, 2009	George W. Bush (2001–2009)
	Larry Summers	January 20, 2009	January 20, 2011	Barack Obama (2009–2017)
	Gene Sperling	January 20, 2011	March 5, 2014	Barack Obama (2009–2017)
	Jeff Zients	March 5, 2014	January 20, 2017	Barack Obama (2009–2017)
	Gary Cohn	January 20, 2017	April 2, 2018	Donald Trump (2017–2021)
	Larry Kudlow	April 2, 2018	January 20, 2021	Donald Trump (2017–2021)
	Brian Deese	January 20, 2021	February 21, 2023	Joe Biden (2021–2025)
	Lael Brainard	February 21, 2023	January 20, 2025	Joe Biden (2021–2025)
	Kevin Hassett	January 20, 2025	Incumbent	Donald Trump (2025–present)
