= Allan B. Hubbard =

American businessman and former government official

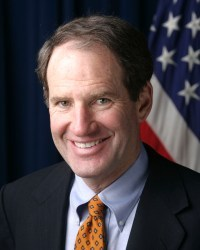

6th Director of the National Economic Council
- In office January 10, 2005 – November 28, 2007
- President: George W. Bush
- Preceded by: Steve Friedman
- Succeeded by: Keith Hennessey

Chair of the Indiana Republican Party
- In office 1993–1994
- Preceded by: Rexford C. Early
- Succeeded by: Mike McDaniel

Personal details
- Born: September 8, 1947 (age 77); Jackson, Tennessee, U.S.
- Political party: Republican
- Education: Vanderbilt University (BA); Harvard University (JD, MBA)

Allan B. Hubbard (born September 8, 1947) is an American businessman and former government official. Hubbard served as Director of the National Economic Council from 2005 to 2007 under President George W. Bush. Earlier in his career, Hubbard served as deputy chief of staff to Vice President Dan Quayle, and as chair of the Indiana Republican Party.

Hubbard is noted for his involvement in education policy, and is a proponent of charter schools. Hubbard was considered for the role of Deputy Secretary of Education in 2017, but ultimately bowed out of the role.

== Early life and education ==
Hubbard was born on September 8, 1947. He received his B.A. degree from Vanderbilt University cum laude in 1969. In 1975, Hubbard received a J.D. from Harvard Law School, also cum laude, and an M.B.A. from Harvard Business School. During his time at Harvard, he was a classmate of Bush.

== Career ==
Hubbard formerly served as director of E & A Industries, a conglomerate in Indiana that owns three chemical companies, among others. A major fundraiser for Bush, Hubbard served as the volunteer chairman of the Indiana Republican Party from 1993 to 1994.

From 1990 to 1992, Hubbard was deputy chief of staff to Vice President Dan Quayle. He formerly served as executive director of the President's Council on Competitiveness, which was chaired by Quayle.

Hubbard formerly served as Director of the National Economic Council from 2005 to 2007 during the Bush administration. He was one of the Members of the 2006 Bilderberg Meeting in Ottawa, Canada, and is a former member of the group's Steering Committee.

During the 2012 United States presidential election cycle, Hubbard was on the planned transition team for Republican nominee Mitt Romney had he been elected. In 2017, Hubbard was considered for the position of Deputy Secretary of Education by President Donald Trump, but ultimately withdrew his name from consideration.

== Political views ==
A board member on the Indiana Commission for Higher Education, Hubbard is a supporter of charter schools. He has advocated for Indianapolis Public Schools (IPS) to enter partnerships with charter schools.

== Personal life ==
Hubbard and his wife, Kathy, are active in education-related causes. The couple established the Hubbard Life-Changing Teacher Awards to provide $25,000 and other awards to IPS teachers.

Party political offices
Preceded by Rexford C. Early	Chair of the Indiana Republican Party; 1993–1994	Succeeded by Mike McDaniel
Political offices
Preceded by Steve Friedman	Director of the National Economic Council; 2005–2007	Succeeded by Keith Hennessey
