= Pawelka =

Pawelka is a surname of Czech (a historical spelling variant of Pavelka) and Polish origin found in Austria, Germany, and Poland. It stems from the male given name Pavel – and may refer to:

- Joseph Pawelka (1887–?), New Zealand criminal and prison escaper
- Rudi Pawelka (1940), German politician

== See also ==
- {{intitle|PaWelka]]
- Pavelka
