= Larry Summers =

American economist (born 1954)

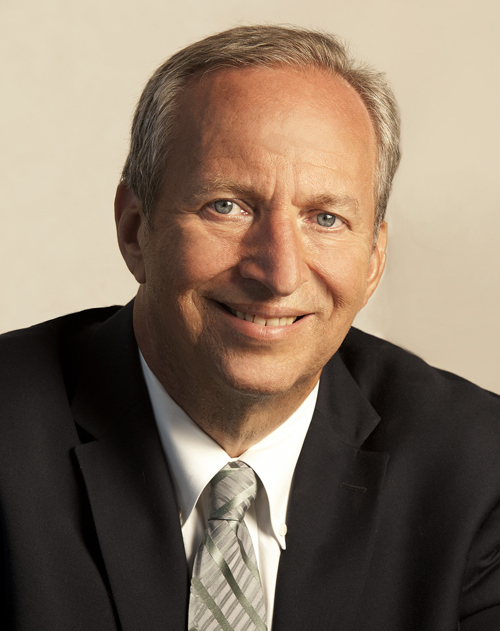
- Summers in 2012

8th Director of the National Economic Council
- In office January 20, 2009 – January 20, 2011
- President: Barack Obama
- Deputy: Diana Farrell; Jason Furman
- Preceded by: Keith Hennessey
- Succeeded by: Gene Sperling

27th President of Harvard University
- In office July 1, 2001 – June 30, 2006
- Preceded by: Neil Rudenstine
- Succeeded by: Derek Bok (acting)

71st United States Secretary of the Treasury
- In office July 2, 1999 – January 20, 2001
- President: Bill Clinton
- Deputy: Stuart E. Eizenstat
- Preceded by: Robert Rubin
- Succeeded by: Paul H. O'Neill

7th United States Deputy Secretary of the Treasury
- In office August 11, 1995 – July 2, 1999
- President: Bill Clinton
- Preceded by: Frank N. Newman
- Succeeded by: Stuart E. Eizenstat

Under Secretary of the Treasury for International Affairs
- In office April 5, 1993 – August 11, 1995
- President: Bill Clinton
- Preceded by: David Mulford
- Succeeded by: Jeffrey R. Shafer

Chief Economist of the World Bank
- In office January 14, 1991 – January 14, 1993
- President: Barber Conable; Lewis Thompson Preston
- Preceded by: Stanley Fischer
- Succeeded by: Michael Bruno

Personal details
- Born: Lawrence Henry Summers; November 30, 1954 (age 71) New Haven, Connecticut, U.S.
- Party: Democratic
- Spouses: Victoria Perry (m. 1984; div. 2003); Elisa New (m. 2005)
- Children: 3
- Education: Massachusetts Institute of Technology (BS); Harvard University (MA, PhD)
- Awards: John Bates Clark Medal (1993)

Academic background
- Thesis: An Asset Price Approach to the Analysis of Capital Income Taxation (1982)
- Doctoral advisor: Martin Feldstein

Academic work
- Discipline: Macroeconomics
- School or tradition: New Keynesian economics
- Institutions: Harvard University; London School of Economics
- Doctoral students: Alan Krueger; Kiminori Matsuyama; James R. Hines Jr. Rhee Chang-yong
- Website: Information at IDEAS / RePEc

Lawrence Henry Summers (born November 30, 1954) is an American economist. He served as the 71st United States Secretary of the Treasury from 1999 to 2001, the 27th president of Harvard University from 2001 to 2006, and the eighth director of the National Economic Council from 2009 to 2010. He was the Charles W. Eliot University Professor at Harvard Kennedy School until his resignation in February 2026.

Summers became a professor of economics at Harvard University in 1983. He left Harvard in 1991, working as the chief economist of the World Bank from 1991 to 1993. In 1993, Summers was appointed Under Secretary for International Affairs of the United States Department of the Treasury under President Bill Clinton's administration. In 1995, he was promoted to Deputy Secretary of the Treasury under his long-time political mentor Robert Rubin. In 1999, he succeeded Rubin as Secretary of the Treasury. While working for the Clinton administration, Summers played a leading role in the American response to the 1994 economic crisis in Mexico, the 1997 Asian financial crisis, and the 1998 Russian financial crisis. He was also influential in the Harvard Institute for International Development and American-advised privatization of the economies of the post-Soviet states, and in the deregulation of the U.S. financial system, including the repeal of the Glass–Steagall Act.

Following the end of Clinton's term, Summers served as the 27th president of Harvard University from 2001 to 2006. Summers resigned as Harvard's president in the wake of a no-confidence vote by Harvard faculty, which resulted in large part from Summers's conflict with Cornel West, financial conflict of interest questions regarding his relationship with Andrei Shleifer, and a 2005 speech in which he offered three reasons for the under-representation of women in science and engineering, including the possibility that there exists a "different availability of aptitude at the high end", in addition to patterns of discrimination and socialization.

After his first departure from Harvard, Summers worked as a managing director at the hedge fund D. E. Shaw & Co. Summers rejoined public service during the Obama administration, serving as the director of the White House United States National Economic Council for President Barack Obama from January 2009 until November 2010, where he was Director of the White House National Economic Council, part of the Obama administration's response to the Great Recession.

He went on leave from his teaching responsibilities at Harvard and his role as the director of the Mossavar-Rahmani Center for Business and Government in November 2025 due to an investigation into his ties to Jeffrey Epstein.

== Early life and education ==
Summers was born in New Haven, Connecticut, on November 30, 1954, into a Jewish family. He was the son of two economists, Robert Summers (who changed the family surname from Samuelson) and Anita Summers (of Romanian-Jewish ancestry), who were both professors at the University of Pennsylvania. He is also the nephew of two Nobel laureates in economics: Paul Samuelson (brother of Robert Summers) and Kenneth Arrow (brother of Anita Arrow Summers). He spent most of his childhood in Penn Valley, Pennsylvania, a suburb of Philadelphia, where he attended Harriton High School.

At age 16, he entered the Massachusetts Institute of Technology (MIT), where he originally intended to study mathematics but soon switched to economics, graduating in 1975. He was also an active member of the MIT debating team and qualified for participation in the annual National Debate Tournament three times. He attended Harvard University as a graduate student, receiving his Ph.D. in 1982.

== Early career (1983–2001) ==
=== Harvard (1983–1987) ===
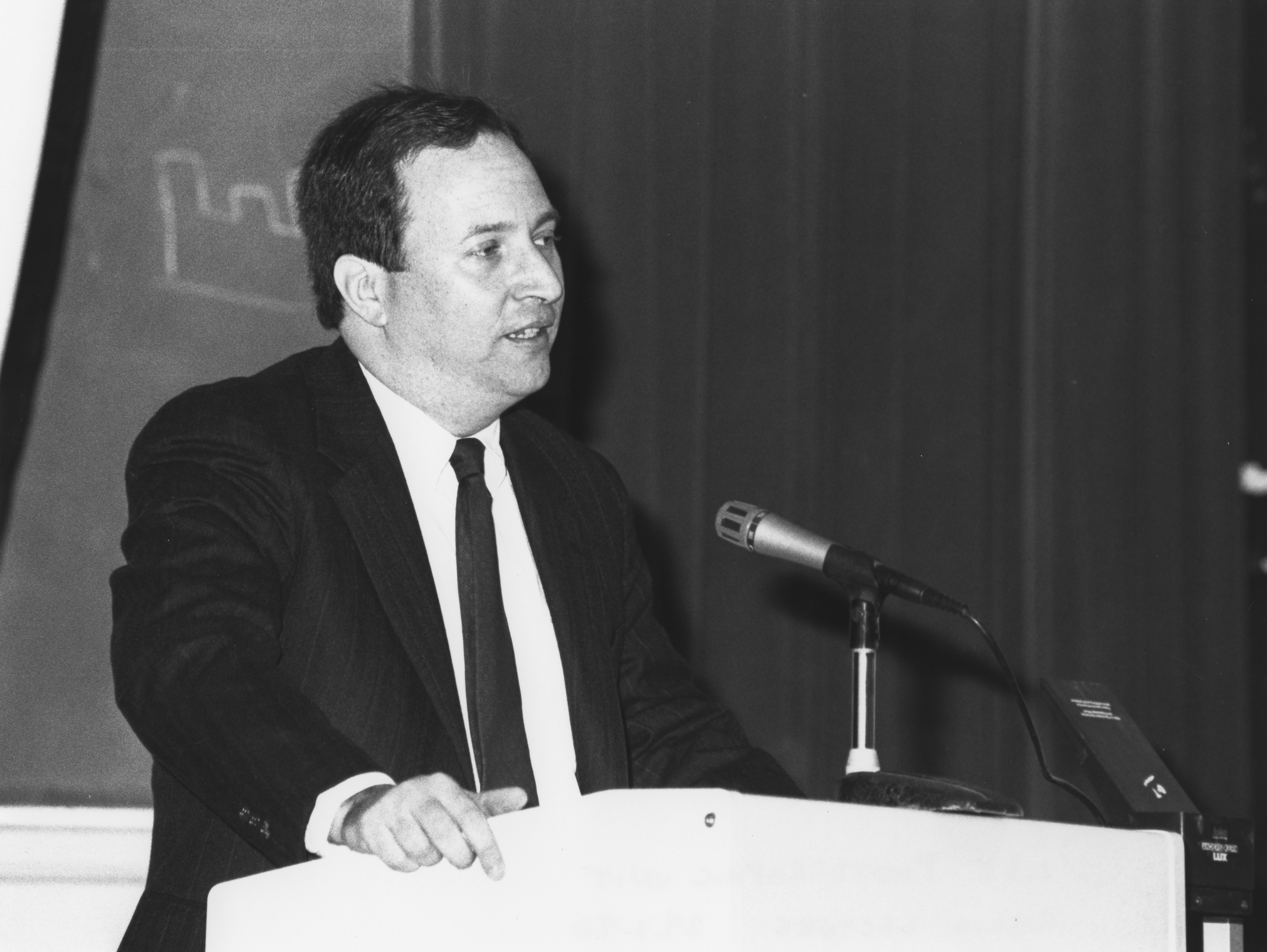
Summers in 1990

In 1983, at age 28, Summers became one of the youngest tenured professors in Harvard's history. He was a visiting academic at the London School of Economics in 1987.

As a researcher, Summers has made important contributions in many areas of economics, primarily public finance, labor economics, financial economics, and macroeconomics. Summers has also worked in international economics, economic demography, economic history and development economics. He received the John Bates Clark Medal in 1993 from the American Economic Association. In 1987, he was the first social scientist to win the Alan T. Waterman Award from the National Science Foundation. Summers is also a member of the National Academy of Sciences. Some of his popular courses, as Charles W. Eliot University Professor at Harvard University, were American Economic Policy and The Political Economy of Globalization.

Summers was on the staff of the Council of Economic Advisers under President Reagan in 1982–1983. He also served as an economics adviser to the Dukakis Presidential campaign in 1988.

=== World Bank (1991–1993) ===
Summers left Harvard in 1991 and served as the Vice President of Development Economics and Chief Economist for the World Bank until 1993.

According to the World Bank's Data & Research office, Summers returned to Washington, D.C., in 1991 as the World Bank's Vice President of Development Economics and Chief Economist. As such, Summers played a "key role" in designing strategies to aid developing countries, worked on the bank's loan committee, guided the bank's research and statistics operations, and guided external training programs. The World Bank's official site also reports that Summers's research included an "influential" report that demonstrated a very high return from investments in educating girls in developing nations.

According to The Economist, Summers was "often at the centre of heated debates" about economic policy, as he was considered a "famous contrarian".

==== "Dirty industries" controversy ====
In December 1991, while at the World Bank, Summers signed a memo that was leaked to the press. Lant Pritchett has claimed authorship of the private memo, which both he and Summers say was intended as sarcasm. The memo stated that "the economic logic behind dumping a load of toxic waste in the lowest wage country is impeccable and we should face up to that. [...] I've always thought that under-populated countries in Africa are vastly underpolluted." According to Pritchett, the memo, as leaked, was doctored to remove context and intended irony.

=== Clinton Administration (1993–2001) ===
==== Treasury Department ====
In 1993, Summers was appointed Undersecretary for International Affairs and later in the United States Department of the Treasury under the Clinton Administration. In 1995, he was promoted to Deputy Secretary of the Treasury under his long-time political mentor Robert Rubin.

Much of Summers's tenure at the Treasury Department was focused on international economic issues. He was deeply involved in the Clinton administration's effort to bail out Mexico and Russia when those nations had currency crises. Summers set up a project through which the Harvard Institute for International Development provided advice to the Russian government between 1992 and 1997. Later there was a scandal when it emerged that some of the Harvard project members had invested in Russia and were therefore not impartial advisors. Summers encouraged then-Russian leader Boris Yeltsin to use the same "three-'ations'" of policy he advocated in the Clinton Administration – "privatization, stabilization, and liberalization".

During the 1997 Asian financial crisis, Summers pressured the Korean government to raise its interest rates and balance its budget in the midst of a recession, policies criticized by Paul Krugman and Joseph Stiglitz. According to the book The Chastening by Paul Blustein during this crisis, Summers, along with Paul Wolfowitz, pushed for regime change in Indonesia.

===== Views on financial regulation =====
On May 7, 1998, the United States Commodity Futures Trading Commission (CFTC) issued a Concept Release soliciting input from regulators, academics, and practitioners to determine "how best to maintain adequate regulatory safeguards without impairing the ability of the OTC (over-the-counter) derivatives market to grow and the ability of U.S. entities to remain competitive in the global financial marketplace." On July 30, 1998, then-Deputy Secretary of the Treasury Summers testified before the U.S. Congress that "the parties to these kinds of contract are largely sophisticated financial institutions that would appear to be eminently capable of protecting themselves from fraud and counterparty insolvencies." At the time Summers stated that "to date there has been no clear evidence of a need for additional regulation of the institutional OTC derivatives market, and we would submit that proponents of such regulation must bear the burden of demonstrating that need." In 1999, Summers endorsed the Gramm–Leach–Bliley Act which removed the separation between investment and commercial banks, saying "With this bill, the American financial system takes a major step forward towards the 21st Century."

==== Treasury Secretary ====
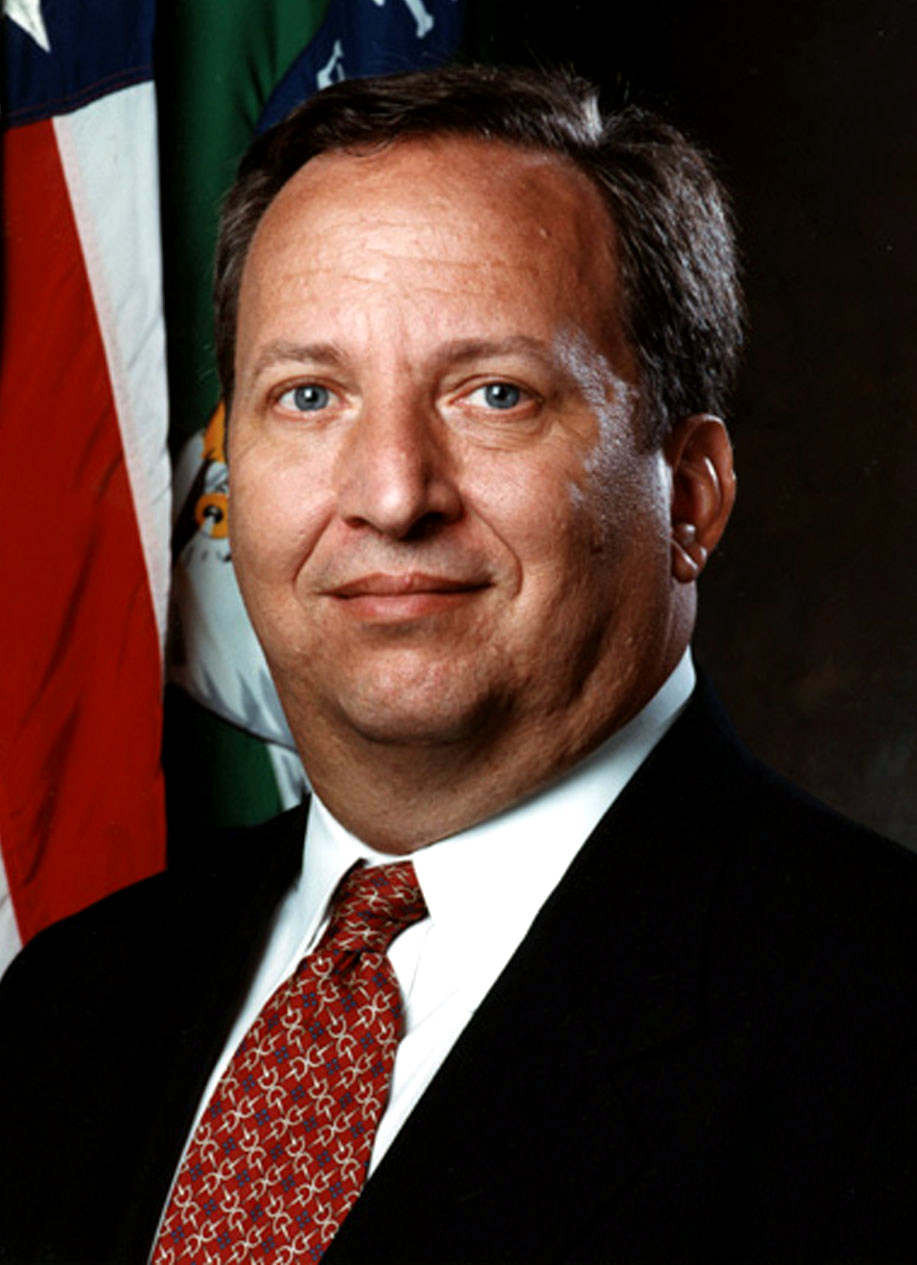
Summers as United States Secretary of the Treasury

In 1999, he succeeded Robert Rubin as Secretary of the Treasury.

Summers was a leading voice within the Clinton Administration arguing against American leadership in greenhouse gas reductions and against US participation in the Kyoto Protocol, according to internal documents made public in 2009.

As Treasury Secretary, Summers led the Clinton Administration's opposition to tax cuts proposed by the Republican Congress in 1999.

During the 2000 California energy crisis, then-Treasury Secretary Summers teamed with Alan Greenspan and Enron executive Kenneth Lay to lecture California Governor Gray Davis on the causes of the crisis, explaining that the problem was excessive government regulation. Under the advice of Kenneth Lay, Summers urged Davis to relax California's environmental standards in order to reassure the markets.

===== Glass–Steagall repeal =====
Summers hailed the Gramm–Leach–Bliley Act in 1999, which lifted more than six decades of restrictions against banks offering commercial banking, insurance, and investment services (by repealing key provisions in the 1933 Glass–Steagall Act): "Today Congress voted to update the rules that have governed financial services since the Great Depression and replace them with a system for the 21st century," Summers said. "This historic legislation will better enable American companies to compete in the new economy." Many critics, including President Barack Obama, have suggested the subprime mortgage crisis of 2007-2010 was caused by the partial repeal of the 1933 Glass–Steagall Act.

As a member of President Clinton's Working Group on Financial Markets, Summers, along with U.S. Securities and Exchange Commission (SEC) Chairman Arthur Levitt, Fed Chairman Greenspan, and Secretary Rubin, torpedoed an effort to regulate the financial derivatives that many blame for bringing the financial market down in Fall 2008.

== Career after White House (2001– ) ==
=== President of Harvard (2001–2006) ===
In 2001, when George W. Bush became President, Summers left the Treasury Department and returned to Harvard as its 27th president, serving from July 2001 until June 2006. He was Harvard's first Jewish president, though his predecessor Neil Rudenstine's father was Jewish.

A number of Summers's decisions at Harvard have attracted public controversy, either at the time or since his resignation.

==== Cornel West ====
In an October 2001 meeting, Summers criticized African American Studies department head Cornel West for allegedly missing three weeks of classes to work on the Bill Bradley presidential campaign and complained that West was contributing to grade inflation. West pushed back strongly against the accusations. West, who later called Summers both "uninformed" and "an unprincipled power player" in describing this encounter in his book Democracy Matters (2004), subsequently returned to Princeton University, where he had taught prior to Harvard University.

==== Differences between the sexes controversy ====
In January 2005, at a Conference on Diversifying the Science & Engineering Workforce sponsored by the National Bureau of Economic Research, Summers sparked controversy with his discussion of why women may have been underrepresented "in tenured positions in science and engineering at top universities and research institutions". The conference was designed to be off-the-record so that participants could speak candidly without fear of public misunderstanding or disclosure later.

Summers had prefaced his talk, saying he was adopting an "entirely positive, rather than normative approach" and that his remarks were intended to be an "attempt at provocation". Summers then began by identifying three hypotheses for the higher proportion of men in high-end science and engineering positions:

1. The high-powered job hypothesis
2. Different availability of aptitude at the high end
3. Different socialization and patterns of discrimination in a search

The second hypothesis, the generally greater variability among men (compared to women) in tests of cognitive abilities, leading to proportionally more males than females at both the lower and upper tails of the test score distributions, caused the most controversy. In his discussion of this hypothesis, Summers said that "even small differences in the standard deviation [between genders] will translate into very large differences in the available pool substantially out [from the mean]". Summers referenced research that implied differences between the standard deviations of males and females in the top 5% of twelfth graders under various tests.

Summers then concluded his discussion of the three hypotheses by saying:

...in the special case of science and engineering, there are issues of intrinsic aptitude, and particularly of the variability of aptitude, and that those considerations are reinforced by what are in fact lesser factors involving socialization and continuing discrimination. I would like nothing better than to be proved wrong, because I would like nothing better than for these problems to be addressable simply by everybody understanding what they are, and working very hard to address them.

Summers then went on to discuss approaches to remedying the shortage of women in high-end science and engineering positions.

This lunch-time talk drew accusations of sexism and careless scholarship, and an intense negative response followed, both nationally and at Harvard; Summers' repeated apologies were to no avail.

Summers's protégée Sheryl Sandberg defended him, saying that "Larry has been a true advocate for women throughout his career" at the World Bank and Treasury.

==== Summers's opposition and support at Harvard ====
On March 15, 2005, members of the Harvard Faculty of Arts and Sciences, which instructs graduate students in Harvard Graduate School of Arts and Sciences and undergraduates in Harvard College, passed 218–185 a motion of "lack of confidence" in the leadership of Summers, with 18 abstentions. A second motion that offered a milder censure of the president passed 253 to 137, also with 18 abstentions.

The members of the Harvard Corporation, the university's highest governing body, are in charge of the selection of the president and issued statements strongly supporting Summers.

FAS faculty were not unanimous in their comments against Summers. Also, Summers had stronger support among Harvard College students than among the college faculty. One poll by The Harvard Crimson indicated that students opposed his resignation by a three-to-one margin, with 57% of responding students opposing his resignation and 19% supporting it.

===== Support of economist Andrei Shleifer =====
Harvard and Andrei Shleifer, a close friend and protégé of Summers, controversially paid $28.5 million to settle a lawsuit by the U.S. government over the conflict of interest Shleifer had while advising Russia's privatization program. The US government had sued Shleifer under the False Claims Act, as he bought Russian stocks while designing the country's privatization. In 2004, a federal judge ruled that while Harvard had violated the contract, Shleifer and his associate alone were liable for treble damages.

In June 2005, Harvard and Shleifer announced that they had reached a tentative settlement with the US government. In August, Harvard, Shleifer, and the Department of Justice reached an agreement under which the university paid $26.5 million to settle the five-year-old lawsuit. Shleifer was also responsible for paying $2 million worth of damages.

Because Harvard paid almost all of the damages and allowed Shleifer to retain his faculty position, the settlement provoked allegations of favoritism on the part of Summers. His continued support for Shleifer weakened Summers's popularity with other professors, as reported in The Harvard Crimson: Frederick H. Abernathy, the McKay professor of mechanical engineering, stated, "I was deeply shocked and disappointed by the actions of this University" in the Shleifer affair.

====== Shleifer–Russia relations ======
An 18,000-word article "How Harvard Lost Russia" in Institutional Investor by David McClintick detailed Shleifer's and his wife's alleged efforts to use his inside knowledge of and sway over the Russian economy in order to make lucrative personal investments, all while leading a Harvard group, advising the Russian government, that was under contract with the U.S. The article suggests that Summers shielded his fellow economist from disciplinary action by the university, and it noted that Summers had forewarned Shleifer and his wife Nancy Zimmerman about the conflict-of-interest regulations in 1996. Summers's friendship with Shleifer was well known by the corporation when it selected him to succeed Rudenstine and Summers recused himself from all proceedings with Shleifer, whose case was actually handled by an independent committee led by former Harvard president Derek Bok.

==== Winklevoss twins and Facebook ====
In February 2004, the Winklevoss twins requested a meeting with Summers in order to ask him to intervene on their behalf in an ongoing dispute they had with Facebook founder Mark Zuckerberg. The Winklevosses believed that Zuckerberg had stolen their idea for a social networking website and launched Facebook on his own, after they had asked him to be a part of their project, then called HarvardConnection. Summers believed that the matter was outside the university's jurisdiction and advised the twins to take their complaint to the courts.

==== Resignation as Harvard President ====
On February 21, 2006, Summers announced his intention to step down at the end of the school year effective June 30, 2006. Harvard agreed to provide Summers on his resignation with a one-year paid sabbatical leave, subsidized a $1 million outstanding loan from the university for his personal residence, and provided other payments. Former University President Derek Bok acted as Interim President while the university conducted a search for a replacement which ended with the naming of Drew Gilpin Faust on February 11, 2007.

The controversy probably cost him the opportunity to service as Treasury Secretary (for a second time) in Obama's administration in 2009.

Over a decade later, in 2016, remarking upon political correctness in institutions of higher education, Summers said:

There is a great deal of absurd political correctness. Now, I'm somebody who believes very strongly in diversity, who resists racism in all of its many incarnations, who thinks that there is a great deal that's unjust in American society that needs to be combated, but it seems to be that there is a kind of creeping totalitarianism in terms of what kind of ideas are acceptable and are debatable on college campuses.

=== After Harvard presidency (2006–2009) ===
After a one-year sabbatical, Summers accepted Harvard University's invitation to serve as the Charles W. Eliot University Professor, one of 20 select University-wide professorships, with offices in the Kennedy School of Government and the Harvard Business School.

==== 2008 Financial Crisis ====
When George Stephanopoulos asked Summers about the 2008 financial crisis in an ABC interview on March 15, 2009, Summers replied that "there are a lot of terrible things that have happened in the last eighteen months, but what's happened at A.I.G. [...] the way it was not regulated, the way no one was watching [...] is outrageous."

In February 2009, Summers quoted John Maynard Keynes, saying "When circumstances change, I change my opinion", reflecting both on the failures of Wall Street deregulation and his new leadership role in the government bailout. On April 18, 2010, in an interview on ABC's This Week program, Clinton said Summers was wrong in the advice he gave him not to regulate derivatives.

=== Obama National Economic Council (2009–2010) ===
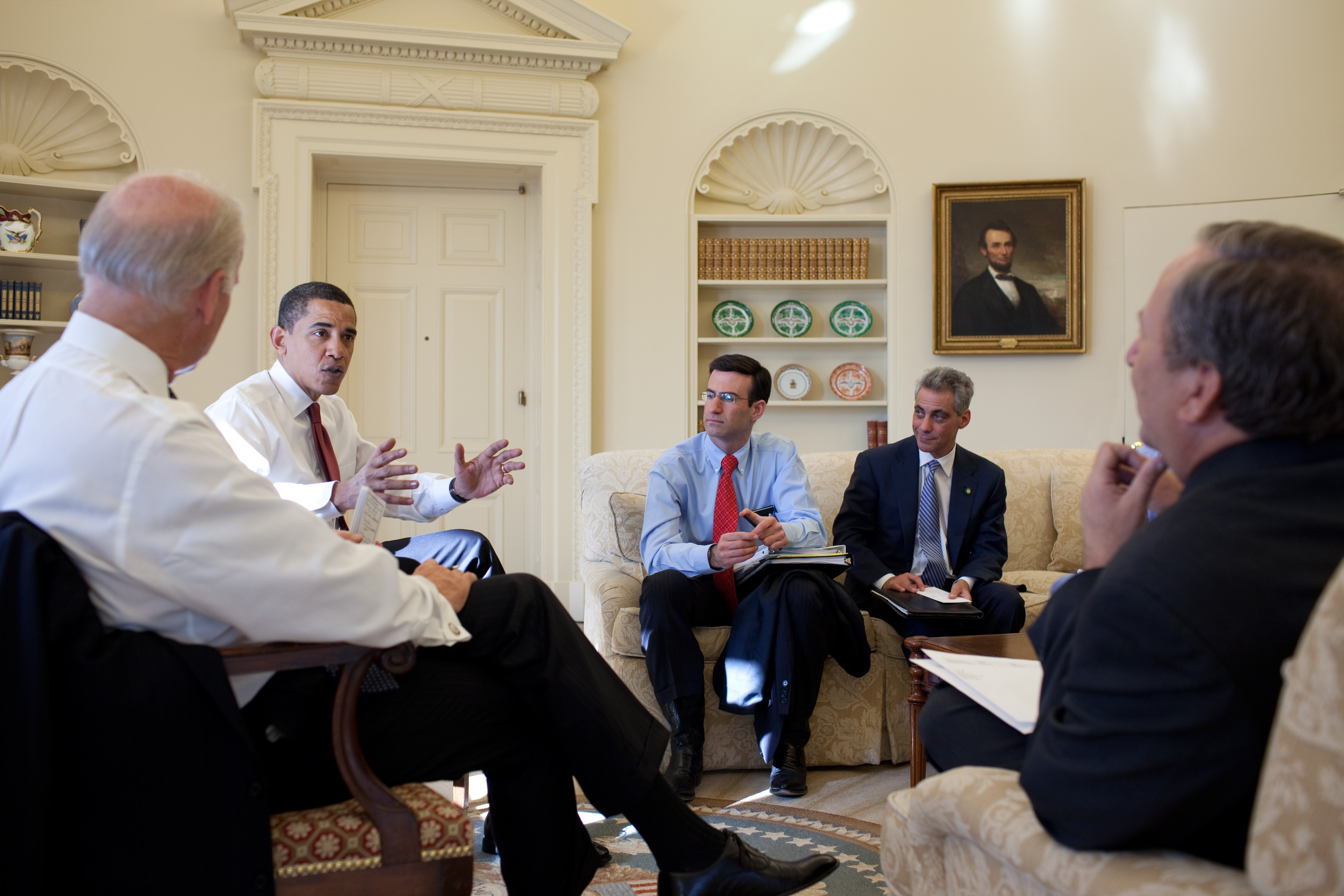
President Barack Obama, on left, discusses with a group in the White House, including Larry Summers on far right (back to camera).

Upon the inauguration of Barack Obama as president in January 2009, Summers was appointed to the post of director of the National Economic Council. In this position Summers emerged as a key economic decision-maker in the Obama administration, where he attracted both praise and criticism. There had been friction between Summers and former Federal Reserve Chairman Paul Volcker, as Volcker accused Summers of delaying the effort to organize a panel of outside economic advisers, and Summers had cut Volcker out of White House meetings and had not shown interest in collaborating on policy solutions to the economic crisis. On the other hand, Obama himself was reportedly thrilled with the work Summers did in his first few weeks on the job. And Peter Orszag, another top economic advisor, called Summers "one of the world's most brilliant economists." According to Henry Kissinger Larry Summers should "be given a White House post in which he was charged with shooting down or fixing bad ideas".

In January 2009, as the Obama Administration tried to pass an economic stimulus spending bill, Representative Peter DeFazio (D-OR) criticized Summers, saying that he thought that President Barack Obama is "ill-advised by Larry Summers. Larry Summers hates infrastructure." DeFazio, along with liberal economists including Paul Krugman and Joseph Stiglitz, had argued that more of the stimulus should be spent on infrastructure, while Summers had supported tax cuts. In late 2008, Summers and economic advisors for then-President-elect Obama presented a memo with options for an economic stimulus package ranging from $550 billion to $900 billion. According to The New Republic, economic advisor Christina Romer initially recommended a $1.8-trillion package, which proposal Summers quickly rejected, believing any stimulus approaching $1 trillion would not be passed by Congress. Romer revised her recommendation to $1.2 trillion, which Summers agreed to include in the memo, but Summers struck the figure at the last minute.

According to the Wall Street Journal, Summers called Senator Chris Dodd (D-CT) asking him to remove caps on executive pay at firms that have received stimulus money, including Citigroup.

On April 3, 2009, Summers came under renewed criticism after it was disclosed that he was paid millions of dollars the previous year by companies which he now had influence over as a public servant. He earned $5 million from the hedge fund D.E. Shaw and collected $2.7 million in speaking fees from Wall Street companies that received government bailout money.

=== Career after NEC (2010– ) ===
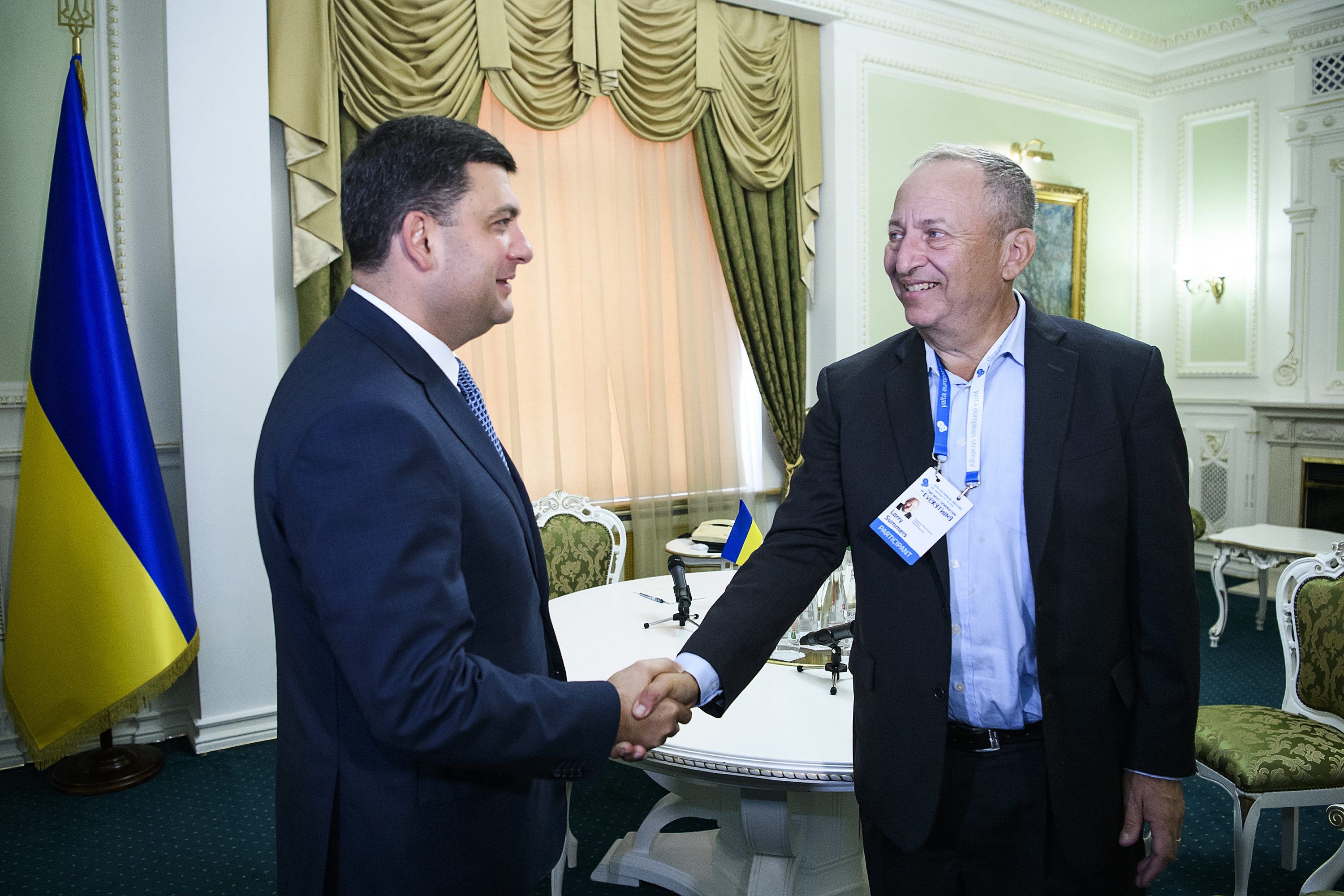
Summers with Volodymyr Groysman in Ukraine

Since leaving the NEC in December 2010, Summers has worked as an advisor to Citigroup and the NASDAQ OMX Group while resuming his role as a tenured Harvard professor. In June 2011 Summers joined the board of directors of Square, a company developing an electronic payment service, and became a special adviser at venture capital firm Andreessen Horowitz. He joined the board of person-to-person lending company Lending Club in December 2012. In July 2015 Summers joined the Board of Directors of Premise Data, a San Francisco-based data and analytics technology company that sources data from a global network of on-the-ground contributors.

==== Federal Reserve chair and Bank of Israel governor candidacy ====
In 2013, Summers was Obama's preferred candidate to succeed Ben Bernanke as chair of the Federal Reserve. His possible nomination created a great deal of controversy with senators of both parties, due to concern about financial conflicts of interest resulting from Summers' very close ties and remuneration from many investment banks and hedge funds over the prior five years. On September 15, Summers withdrew his name from consideration for the position, writing: "I have reluctantly concluded that any possible confirmation process for me would be acrimonious and would not serve the interest of the Federal Reserve, the Administration or, ultimately, the interests of the nation's ongoing economic recovery."

The same year, it was reported that Summers was a candidate to succeed Stanley Fischer as governor of the Bank of Israel. Netanyahu personally asked Summers to take the post, which he declined in October 2013.

== Relationship with Jeffrey Epstein ==
An article in The Harvard Crimson in 2003, during Summers's tenure as president, detailed a reportedly "special connection" between Summers and Jeffrey Epstein. Epstein pledged to donate at least $25 million to Harvard during Summers' tenure to endow Harvard's Program for Evolutionary Dynamics, and Epstein was given an office at Harvard for his personal use. Epstein otherwise had no formal connection to Harvard. Summers' ties to Epstein reportedly began "a number of years...before Summers became Harvard's president and even before he was the Secretary of the Treasury." Flight records introduced as evidence in the 2021 trial of Epstein associate Ghislaine Maxwell show that Summers flew on Jeffrey Epstein's private plane on at least four occasions, including once in 1998 when Summers was United States Deputy Secretary of the Treasury and at least three times while Harvard president. A charity funded by Epstein also donated to the production of a PBS show hosted by Summers's wife and Harvard professor Elisa New. In 2014, Summers emailed Epstein requesting "small scale philanthropy advice" for his wife's nonprofit, Verse Video Education.

Documents released by Congress on November 12, 2025 revealed frequent email communication between Summers and Epstein from 2017 to 2019. From November 2018 to July 5, 2019, a day before Epstein's arrest, Summers sought advice from him on how to pursue a sexual relationship with a woman he described as a mentee. In an October 27, 2017 email, he implied to Epstein that women on average had lower IQ than men, writing that "I observed that half the IQ in the world was possessed by women without mentioning they are more than 51 percent of population". In another set of emails, Summers expressed his dislike of men getting trouble in the office for "hitting on" women. Summers is also mentioned as having sexual relations with underage girls, as explained by files release by the DOJ

Summers issued a statement that his association with Epstein was "a major error of judgement". On November 14, 2025, President Trump directed the United States Department of Justice to investigate Epstein's relationship with, among others, Summers. On November 17, 2025, Summers agreed to step back from his public commitments such as his role in the advisory group of The Yale Budget Lab, his role in the advisory group of the Hamilton Project (an economics policy arm of the Brookings Institution), his fellowship with the Center for American Progress, and his role as chair of the Center for Global Development. On November 18, 2025, Summers also ended his role as a paid contributor to Bloomberg News. Summers also agreed to go on leave from his teaching duties at Harvard and from being director of the Mossavar-Rahmani Center for Business and Government at Harvard for the same reason.

On December 2, 2025, the American Economic Association (AEA) imposed a lifetime ban on Summers, prohibiting him from holding membership in the association or participating in any AEA-sponsored events, including attending or speaking at its activities.

On February 25, 2026, Summers announced that he would resign from his professorship at Harvard, as well as from his directorship of the Mossavar-Rahmani Center for Business and Government, at the end of the 2025–2026 academic year due to continuing fallout from revelations of his relationship with Epstein.

== Business interests ==
Upon being nominated Treasury Secretary by President Clinton in 1999, Summers listed assets of about $900,000 and debts, including a mortgage, of $500,000. By the time he returned in 2009 to serve in the Obama administration, he reported a net worth between $17 million and $39 million.

In May 2006, Summers became a member of the Panel of Eminent Persons which reviewed the work of the United Nations Conference on Trade and Development. He is a member in the Group of Thirty. He served on the Berggruen Institute's 21st Century Council and was part of a 2015 Berggruen-organized meeting with Chinese president Xi Jinping. He is a former member of the Steering Committee of the Bilderberg Group.

In November 2006, Summers was hired by New York City hedge fund D. E. Shaw & Co., for one day a week. Over the following 16 months he received $5.2 million for his work there. His other hedge fund activities included serving on the board of advisers of Taconic Capital Advisors, founded by Goldman Sachs alumni Frank Brosens and Ken Brody. At the same time, during 2008, Summers earned $2.7 million in speaking fees from major financial institutions, including Goldman Sachs, JPMorgan Chase, Citigroup, Merrill Lynch, and Lehman Brothers.

In 2013, Summers became an early angel investor in India's first car rental company, Zoomcar, which was started by his former Harvard Teaching Fellow. Summers was involved in Genie Energy and Bari Weiss's University of Austin; he resigned in 2023 following detailed reporting by The Wall Street Journal regarding his many years of fund-raising activities for Harvard University with Jeffrey Epstein. Summers had also been on the advisory board of SandboxAQ since August 2024; as of 19 November 2025, he was no longer listed as an advisor. In November 2023, Summers joined the board of directors of artificial intelligence organization OpenAI, then resigned in November 2025 after revelations about his ties to child sex offender Jeffrey Epstein were revealed.

== Views ==
=== Brexit referendum ===
In April 2016, he was one of eight former Treasury secretaries who called on the United Kingdom to remain a member of the European Union ahead of the June 2016 Referendum. Summers referred to the United Kingdom's Brexit vote on June 23, 2016, in favor of leaving the European Union as the "worst self-inflicted policy wound that a country has done since the Second World War". However, Summers cautioned that the result was a "wake up call for elites everywhere" and called for "responsible nationalism" in response to simmering public sentiment.

In June 2016, Summers also wrote, "I believe the risks to the US and global economies of Mr Trump's election as president are far greater [than passage of Brexit]. If he is elected, I would expect a protracted recession to begin within 18 months. The damage would be felt far beyond the United States."

=== 2020 presidential election ===
A coalition of progressive groups called on Joe Biden's 2020 presidential campaign no longer to use Summers as an advisor, after reports surfaced that Summers was advising the campaign on economic policy. Progressive groups like the Sunrise Movement and Justice Democrats petitioned the campaign to disavow Summers, saying, "Summers's legacy is advocating for policies that contributed to the skyrocketing inequality and climate crisis we're living with today." Following the outcry, Summers stated he would not be joining a future Biden administration, in the event that Biden defeated Donald Trump in the 2020 presidential election.

==== Criticism of the Biden Administration ====
Summers emerged as an early opponent of President Joe Biden's economic policy, calling the $1.9 trillion American Rescue Plan Act of 2021 "the least responsible macroeconomic policy we've had in the last 40 years" and arguing that it risked economic recession and market destabilization.

=== Israel ===
In October 2023, following the October 7 attacks and the subsequent Gaza war, several Harvard undergraduate student groups signed a letter condemning Israel, holding it "entirely responsible for all unfolding violence". The letter led to a backlash from several prominent Harvard alumni, including Summers, who said that he was "sickened" by it. Summers, though agreeing with Bill Ackman on the need to examine the political views of employees, called Ackman's request to release the names of all the students involved in signing the letter "the stuff of Joe McCarthy".

Summers has criticized the Harvard administration for its failure to curb what he sees as rising antisemitism at the university since the Gaza war. In March 2025, he expressed concern that the Harvard Corporation, the university's highest governing body, was inadequately addressing antisemitism on campus; specifically, Summers criticized current Harvard President Alan Garber for failing to issue a final report with recommendations despite Garber having convened a task force on combating antisemitism over a year earlier, in January 2024.

== Personal life ==
Summers was diagnosed with late-stage Hodgkin's lymphoma in 1983, shortly after becoming a tenured professor at Harvard; he underwent nine months of chemotherapy treatment and has remained cancer-free.

Summers met his first wife, Victoria Joanne Perry, in Cambridge, Massachusetts, while he was working on his dissertation and she was preparing to enter Harvard Law School. Her mother was a professor of mathematics at the University of Maine, and she was raised in Bangor, Maine. They married in 1984, and had three children together, twin girls and a son. Perry is a tax attorney and legal scholar.

In 2001, Summers met then-Harvard College English professor Elisa New; they married in December 2005 at Elmwood and spent their honeymoon on Little Saint James. As of 2006, Summers resided in Brookline, Massachusetts.

== In popular culture ==
The 2010 film The Social Network, which deals with the founding of the social networking site Facebook, shows Summers (played by Douglas Urbanski), in his then-capacity as President of Harvard, meeting with Cameron and Tyler Winklevoss to discuss their accusations against Mark Zuckerberg.

In the 2010 documentary Inside Job, Summers is presented as one of the key figures behind the 2008 financial crisis. Charles Ferguson points out the economist's role in what he characterizes as the deregulation of many domains of the financial sector.

== See also ==
- Economic policy of the Barack Obama administration
- List of Harvard University politicians
- List of Jewish United States Cabinet members

Diplomatic posts
Preceded by Stanley Fischer	Chief Economist of the World Bank; 1991–1993	Succeeded by Michael Bruno
Political offices
Preceded by David C. Mulford	Under Secretary of the Treasury for International Affairs; 1993–1995	Succeeded by Michael Bruno
Preceded by Frank Newman	United States Deputy Secretary of the Treasury; 1995–1999	Succeeded by Stu Eizenstat
Preceded by Bob Rubin	United States Secretary of the Treasury; 1999–2001	Succeeded by Paul O'Neill
Preceded by Keith Hennessey	Director of the National Economic Council; 2009–2011	Succeeded by Gene Sperling
Academic offices
Preceded by Neil Rudenstine	President of Harvard University; 2001–2006	Succeeded by Derek Bok; Acting
U.S. order of precedence (ceremonial)
Preceded by Rodney E. Slater as Former U.S. Cabinet Member	Order of precedence of the United States as Former U.S. Cabinet Member	Succeeded by Ann Veneman as Former U.S. Cabinet Member
