= Mossavar-Rahmani Center for Business and Government =

Research center at Harvard University

The Mossavar-Rahmani Center for Business and Government (M-RCBG) is a research center at Harvard University, located at the John F. Kennedy School of Government (The Kennedy School). The Center is presently under the leadership of Lawrence H. Summers, Weil Director, Mossavar-Rahmani Center for Business and Government, and Charles W. Eliot University Professor and John A. Haigh, Co-Director, Mossavar-Rahmani Center for Business and Government, and Lecturer in Public Policy, Harvard Kennedy School.

== History ==
The Mossavar-Rahmani Center for Business & Government was founded in the fall of 1982 by former Harvard President Derek Bok (1971–1991), former Kennedy School Dean Graham Allison (1977–1989), Harvard alumnus Frank Weil, and former Lamont University Professor John Dunlop (1938–1984).

Dunlop was a former Dean of the Faculty of Arts and Sciences (1969–1973) and former Secretary of Labor in the Ford Administration (1975–1976). He returned to Harvard as the Lamont University Professor to teach at both the Business School and the John F. Kennedy School of Government.

== Directors ==
Jason Furman and John A. Haigh currently serve as Director and Co-Director of the Mossavar-Rahmani Center for Business & Government.

=== Past Directors ===
- Winthrop Knowlton (1982–1987)
- John T. Dunlop (1987–1991)
- Richard Cavanagh (1991–1993)
- John P. White (1993–1995)
- Roger B. Porter (1995–2000)
- Ira Jackson (2000–2002)
- John Ruggie (2002–2008)
- Roger B. Porter (2008–2010)
- John Haigh (2011–present)
- Lawrence H. Summers (2011–2026)

== Research Areas and Programs ==
=== Achieving Shared & Sustainable Prosperity ===
- Sustainability Science Program (SSP)
- Education Policy Program
- Growthpolicy
- Financial Sector Program
- Technology, Innovation and Regulation
- Harvard Kennedy School (HKS) Healthcare Policy Program
- Program on Science, Technology and Society (STS)
- Public Impact Analytics Science Lab (PIAS-Lab)

=== Regulation, Energy, Environment and Technology ===
- Regulatory Policy Program
- Harvard Climate Internship Program
- Harvard Environmental Economics Program (HEEP)
- Project on Climate Agreements
- Harvard Electricity Policy Group (HEPG)

==== China, Asia and the Global Economic System ====
- Rising Chinese Economic Power
- Trade and Negotiation Program
- Kansai Keizai Doyukai Program

=== Exploring Capitalism and the Role of the Corporation ===
- Corporate Responsibility Initiative
- Corporation, Governance and Public Policy

=== Senior Fellows ===
M-RCBG Senior Fellows contribute to understanding the evolving relationship between business and government. They are professionals from government and/or business who come to M-RCBG to address issues at the interface of the public and private sectors: regulation, corporate governance, and the role of government in the changing global economy. Senior fellows undertake independent research projects that culminate in a working paper, a journal article or, in rare cases, a book. They also offer study groups for Harvard students.

Every senior fellow is sponsored by a Harvard Kennedy School faculty member, and a committee of M-RCBG-affiliated faculty reviews applications, recommends fellows appointments and assigns faculty sponsors.

=== Grossman Fellowship ===
The Jerome H. Grossman M.D. Graduate Fellowship honors Dr. Jerome H. Grossman, whose career focused on strengthening health care delivery in the United States.
