= Pavelka Farmstead =

- U.S. National Register of Historic Places
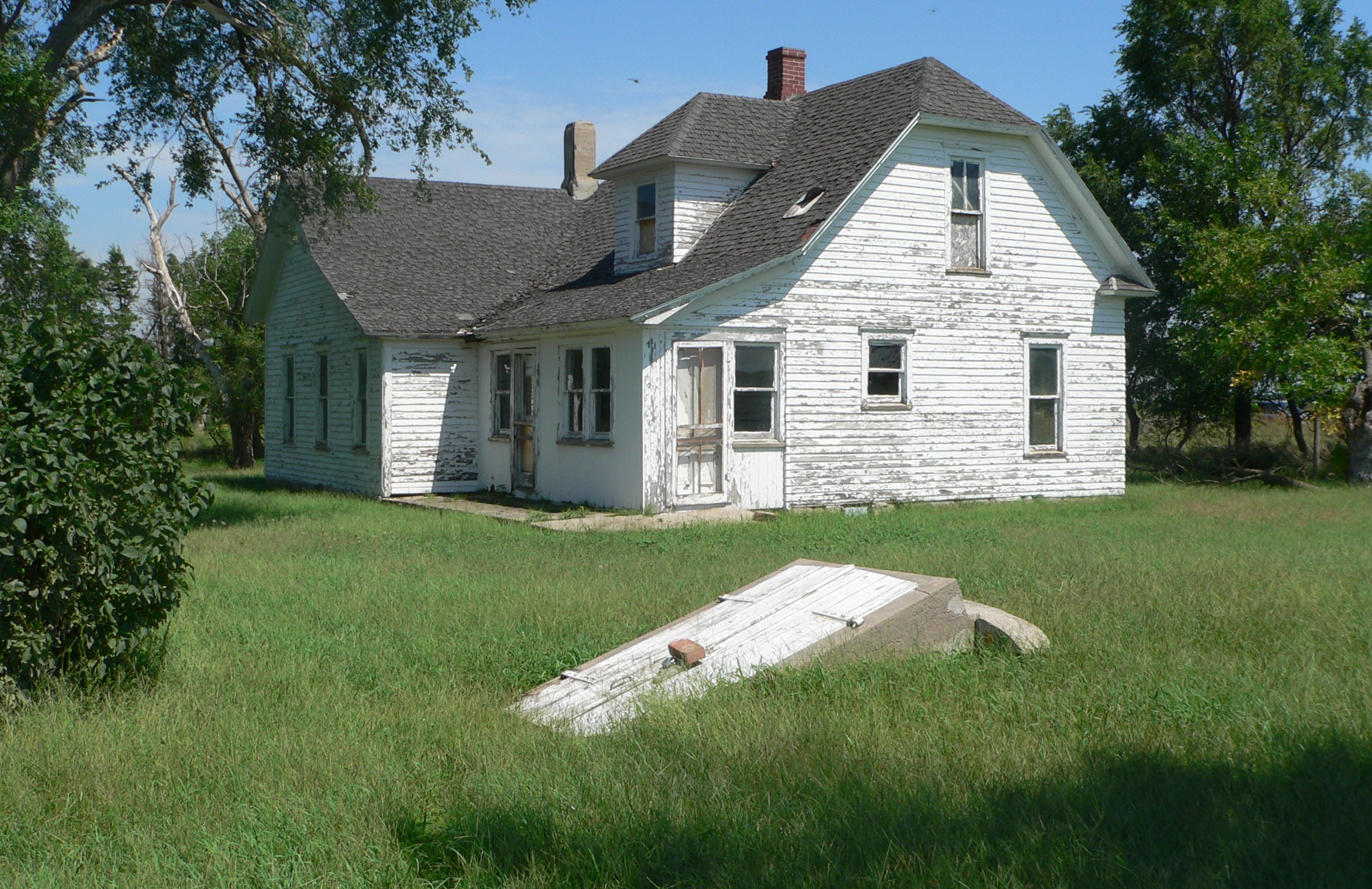
- House and cellar entrance

- Location within Nebraska Location within the United States
- Location: Southeast of Bladen, Nebraska
- Coordinates: 40°16′56″N 98°32′22″W
- NRHP reference No.: 79001459
- Added to NRHP: April 13, 1979

The Pavelka Farmstead, also known as the Antonia Farmstead, is a house located near Bladen in rural Webster County in south-central Nebraska, on land once owned and occupied by John and Anna Sadilek Pavelka. The farmstead provided a setting, and its occupants characters, for several of the works of author Willa Cather, who grew up in Webster County.

== Sadílek and Cather ==
The family of Bohemian immigrants František and Antonie Sadílek arrived in Webster County in 1880; their daughter, Antonie (Annie), was twelve years old at that time. Three years later, the Cather family moved from Virginia to Nebraska, bringing their nine-year-old daughter Willa. The Cathers initially settled with relatives on the Divide, a narrow region of flat-lying plains between the watersheds of the Big Blue River to the north and the Republican River to the south. A year later, they moved into the city of Red Cloud to the south.

According to Willa Cather, she often saw Annie Sadílek during her youth. The wagon road from the Catherton precinct to Red Cloud passed near the Sadílek farm; and Annie later moved to Red Cloud, where she worked as a hired girl.

The young Cather was intrigued by the immigrants who had settled in south-central Nebraska, and by the Czechs in particular. In a 1923 essay, she wrote

Many of our Czech immigrants were people of a very superior type. The political emigration resulting from the revolutionary disturbances of 1848 was distinctly different from the emigration resulting from economic causes, and brought to the United States brilliant young men from both Germany and Bohemia.

In 1890, Cather graduated from Red Cloud High School and moved to Lincoln to enroll in the University of Nebraska. In 1892, Annie Sadílek went west with a railroad employee. Shortly after, she returned to the family farm and bore her first child, a daughter named Lucille. In 1896, she married John Pavelka; the family subsequently grew to ten children, including Lucille, who took the name Pavelka.

== Pavelka farmstead ==
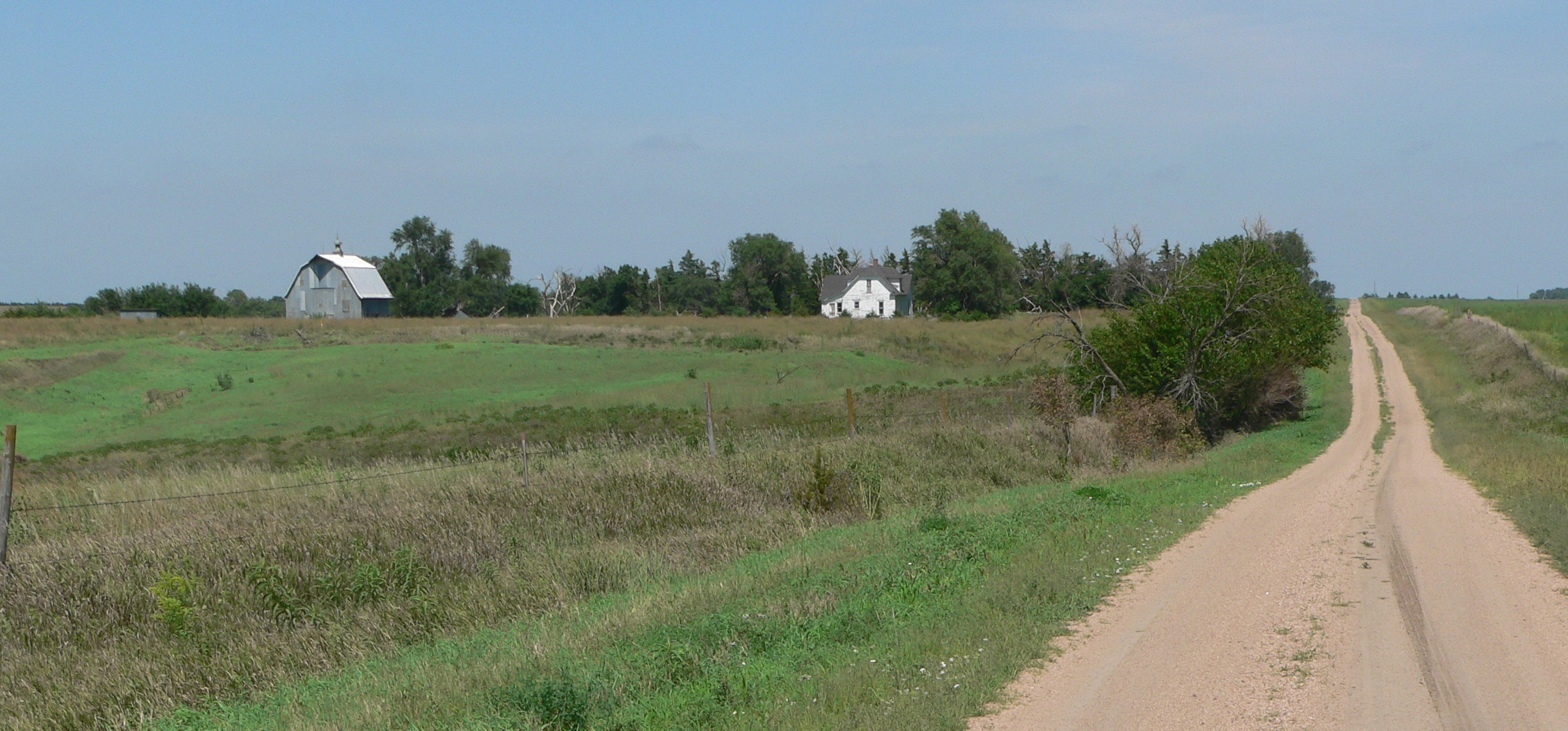
Pavelka farmstead, viewed from the south along county road 1100

In 1906, the Pavelkas bought a farm on the Divide, in the northern part of a small region settled by Bohemians. Soon thereafter, possibly in 1911, they bought a one-story two-room house, probably built in the late 19th century, which they moved from a nearby farm to their own. By 1915, they had constructed a 1 1/2-story addition on the south side, expanding the house to seven rooms.

The house lies along the east side of a courtyard centered on the well, delimited by farm buildings and trees. A large barn with its associated fencing forms the west side. Smaller sheds and granaries lie along the north and south sides; there are shelterbelts on the south and the north, with the remains of an orchard in the north shelterbelt. The principal entrance of the house opens into the courtyard rather than toward the road, in keeping with traditional Czech village construction.

A brick-vaulted cellar, with its entrance southwest of the house, was constructed at some time after the house's expansion.

== Cuzak and Rosicky ==
Cather had remained in touch with her friends in Webster County, although she had moved from Nebraska to Pittsburgh and then to New York. In the fall of 1916, she paid an extended visit to Annie Pavelka. By the end of that year, she had the idea for My Ántonia; the book was completed by about the middle of 1918. The characters of Ántonia Shimerda Cuzak and Anton Cuzak were based on Annie and John Pavelka; the Pavelka place is described in the final chapter, "Cuzak's Boys", with a scene set in the cellar (in the novel, called the "fruit cave").

The Pavelkas are also the models for Anton and Mary Rosicky in Cather's 1932 story "Neighbour Rosicky"; and the Pavelka farmstead is the setting of the story.

== Later history ==
John Pavelka died in 1926; Anna Pavelka, in 1955. At some time after both of them had died, probably in the 1950s, the house was remodelled: the porch was enclosed and given two external doors, and a south-facing gable window was raised. Several of the sheds have undergone significant deterioration.

In 1979, the property was listed in the National Register of Historic Places. It is part of the Willa Cather State Historic Site, a collection of 26 individual sites and four historic districts in Webster County that are connected with Cather and her work.

The house is owned by the Willa Cather Foundation and is the site of tours and educational programming. In 2020, renovation was undertaken to restore the home to its 1916 appearance.
