= Gurara II Hydroelectric Power Station =

Power station in Nigeria

- Location of Gurara II Power Station; Placement on map is approximate Gurara II Hydroelectric Power Station (Africa) Gurara II Hydroelectric Power Station (Earth)
- Location: Kagarko, Kaduna State, Nigeria
- Coordinates: 09°36′50″N 07°41′31″E
- Construction began: 2023 Expected
- Opening date: 2026 Expected
- Construction cost: US$1.24 billion
- Owner: Federal Government of Nigeria

Dam and spillways
- Type of dam: Gravity dam
- Impounds: Gurara River

Power Station
- Turbines: 6
- Installed capacity: 360 MW (480,000 hp)
- Annual generation: 1,130 GWh

The Gurara II Power Station is a proposed 360 megawatts hydroelectric power station across the Gurara River in Nigeria. The power station is owned and is under development by the Federal Government of Nigeria. The Exim Bank of China has agreed to lend US$1 billion towards the construction of this renewable energy project. The Nigerian Federal Executive Council accepted that offer in May 2019.

The power station is separate from the 30 MW (40,000 hp) Gurara I Hydroelectric Power Station that crosses the same river and was under development by a concessionaire, as of May 2021.

== Location ==
The power station would lie across the Gurara River, downstream of the 30 megawatts Gurara I Hydroelectric Power Station. This is near the settlement of Kagarko, in Kaduna State, located in North-West Nigeria.

Kagarko is located approximately 148 kilometres (92 mi), by road, south of Kaduna metropolis of the state capital. This is about 92 kilometres (57 mi) northeast of Abuja, the capital city of Nigeria.

== Overview ==
The design calls for generation capacity of 360 Mega Watts. A penstock pipe measuring 100 metres (328 ft) in length and 4.4 metres (14 ft) in diameter will direct water from the reservoir to the generation turbines inside the power house. The dam and power station will be built in one phase.

== Ownership ==
As of December 2021, this power station was owned by the Nigerian Federal Ministry of Water Resources.

== Construction costs and funding ==
It has been reported that construction of this power station is expected to cost US$1.240 billion. The table below illustrates the expected sources of funding for the construction of the project.

Sources of funding for Gurara Hydroelectric Power Station
Rank	Source	Dollar Amount (millions)	Percentage
1	Exim Bank of China	1,000	80.6
2	Government of Nigeria	240	19.4
	Total	1,240	100.0

== Completion date ==
Groundbreaking is expected in 2023 and commercial commissioning is anticipated in 2026.

== See also ==
- List of power stations in Nigeria
