= Kozmice (Benešov District) =

- Municipality
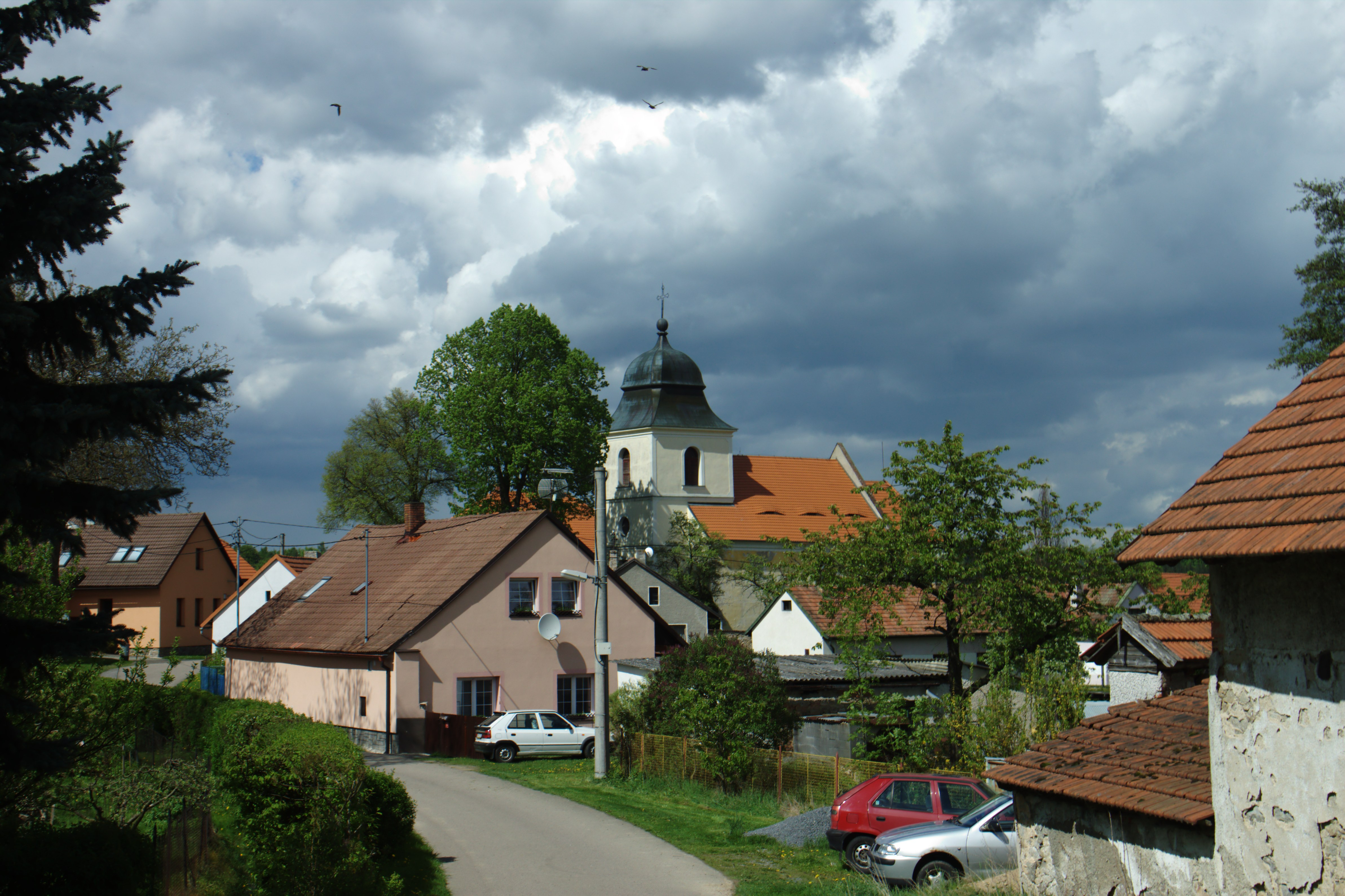
- View from the north

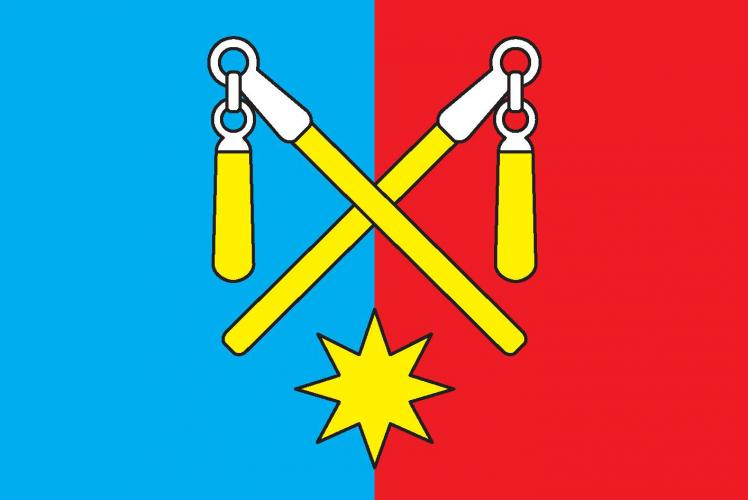
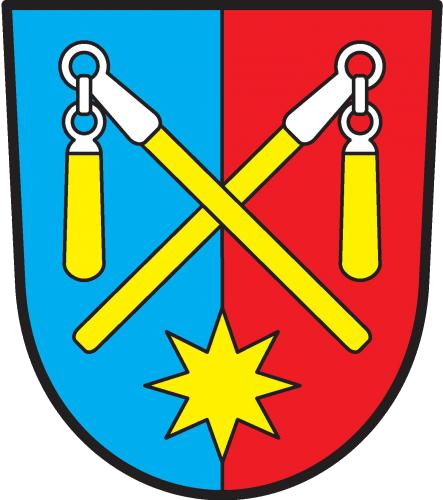
- Flag Coat of arms

- Location in the Czech Republic
- Coordinates: 49°49′29″N 14°47′46″E
- Country: Czech Republic
- Region: Central Bohemian
- District: Benešov
- First mentioned: 1350

Area
  - Total: 7.96 km^{2} (3.07 sq mi)
- Elevation: 490 m (1,610 ft)

Population (2026-01-01)
  - Total: 423
  - Density: 53.1/km^{2} (138/sq mi)
- Time zone: UTC+1 (CET)
  - Summer (DST): UTC+2 (CEST)
- Postal code: 256 01
- Website: www.obeckozmice.cz

Kozmice is a municipality and village in Benešov District in the Central Bohemian Region of the Czech Republic. It has about 400 inhabitants.

== Administrative division ==
Kozmice consists of three municipal parts (in brackets population according to the 2021 census):

- Kozmice (309)
- Kácova Lhota (59)
- Rousínov (25)

== Etymology ==
The name is derived from the personal name Kozma (a Czech variant of the name Cosmas), meaning "the village of Kozma's people".

== Geography ==
Kozmice is located about 9 kilometres (6 mi) northeast of Benešov and 31 km (19 mi) southeast of Prague. It lies in the Benešov Uplands. The highest point is a nameless hill at 532 m (1,745 ft) above sea level.

== History ==
The first written mention of Kozmice is from 1350. Until the second half of the 15th century, the village was owned by local noble families, then it was annexed to the Konopiště estate.

== Demographics ==
Historical population

Year	Pop.	±%
1869	545	—
1880	626	+14.9%
1890	678	+8.3%
1900	575	−15.2%
1910	654	+13.7%

Year	Pop.	±%
1921	543	−17.0%
1930	460	−15.3%
1950	391	−15.0%
1961	375	−4.1%
1970	358	−4.5%

Year	Pop.	±%
1980	309	−13.7%
1991	234	−24.3%
2001	231	−1.3%
2011	274	+18.6%
2021	393	+43.4%

Source: Censuses

== Transport ==
There are no railways or major roads passing through the municipality.

== Sights ==
The main landmark of Kozmice is the Church of Saint James the Great. It is a Gothic building from the turn of the 13th and 14th centuries, modified in the Baroque style.
