= My Ántonia =

1918 novel by Willa Cather

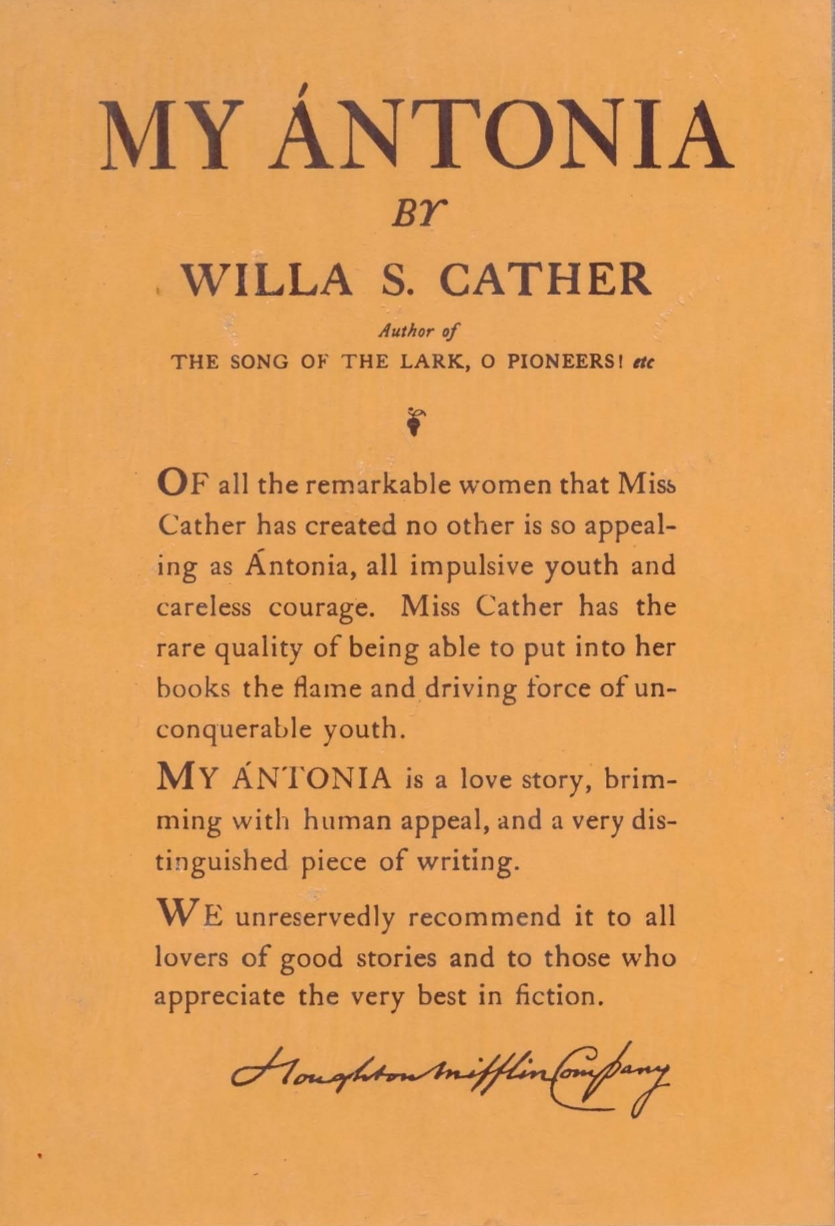
- First edition dustjacket
- Author: Willa Cather
- Language: English
- Genre: Historical fiction, Western fiction
- Set in: Nebraska, 1880s
- Publisher: Houghton Mifflin (Boston)
- Publication date: 1918
- Publication place: United States
- Pages: 175
- OCLC: 30894639
- Dewey Decimal: 813/.52 20
- LC Class: PS3505.A87 M8
- Preceded by: The Song of the Lark
- Text: My Ántonia at Wikisource

My Ántonia (/ˈæntəniə/ AN-tə-nee-ə) is a novel published in 1918 by American writer Willa Cather.

The novel tells the stories of an orphaned boy from Virginia, Jim Burden, and the elder daughter in a family of Bohemian immigrants, Ántonia Shimerda, who are each brought as children to be pioneers in Nebraska towards the end of the 19th century. The first year in the very new place leaves strong impressions on both children, affecting them for life.

This novel is considered Cather's first masterpiece. Cather was praised for bringing the American West to life and making it personally interesting.

== Title ==
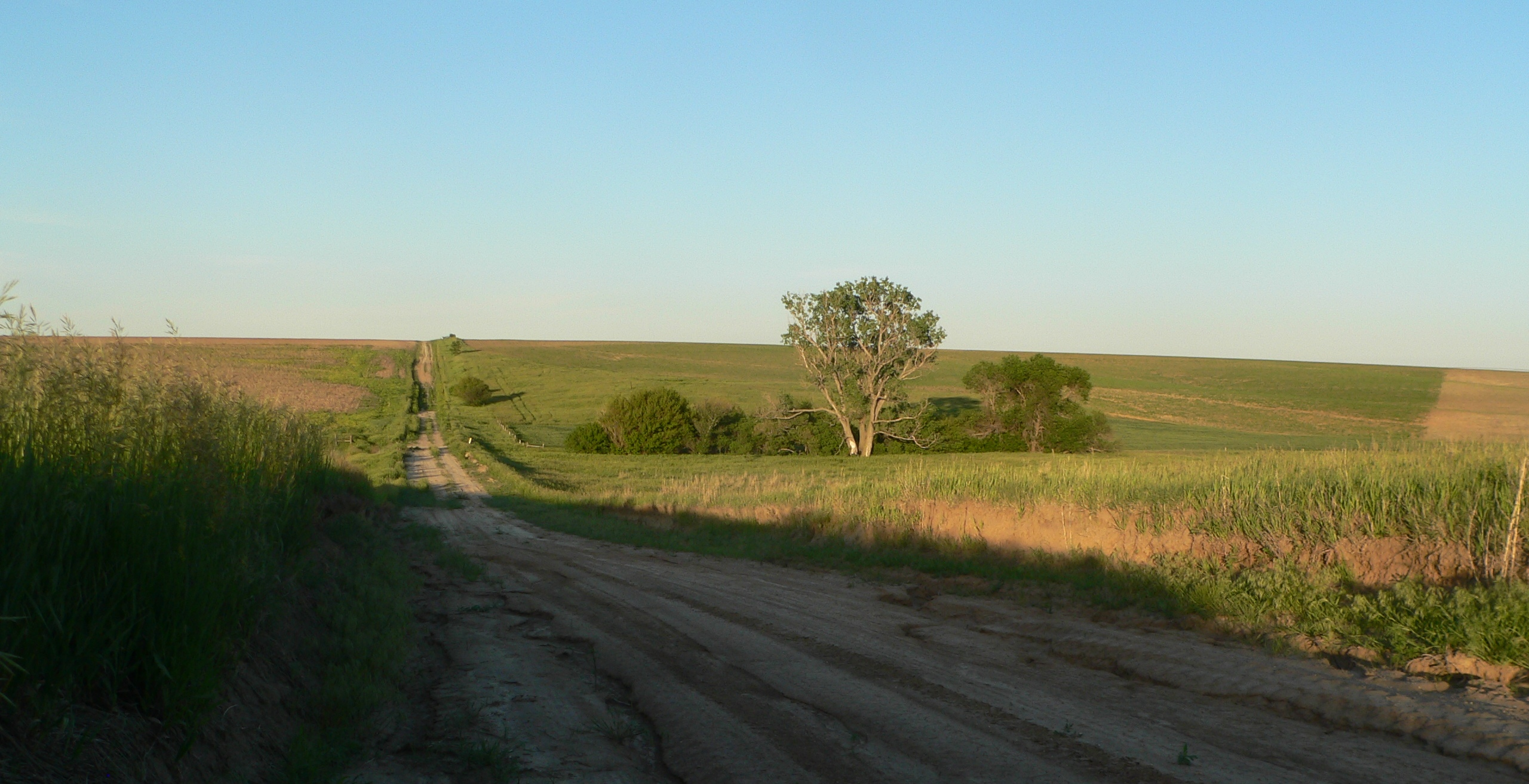
Landscape of the Cather homestead

The title refers to Ántonia, a young woman immigrant to the western prairies of the US. The story is told by her friend Jim, who arrives there at age ten to live with his grandparents. Jim thinks of her as his close friend, "my Ántonia".

The name Ántonia is pronounced in an approximation of the Czech. Cather writes, "The Bohemian name Ántonia is strongly accented on the first syllable, like the English name Anthony, and the i is given the sound of long e. The name is pronounced An'-ton-ee-ah." (a footnote in the text, at the start of Book I, "The Shimerdas"). The acute accent in Czech does not represent a stressed syllable but a long vowel; all Czech words are stressed on the first syllable by default. Note that the English short a sound, /æ/, is qualitatively different from the Czech á, which is pronounced /aː/. The Czech pronunciation can be heard at this sound file.

== Narration ==
Cather chose a first-person narrator because she felt that novels depicting deep emotion, such as My Ántonia, were most effectively narrated by a character in the story. The novel is divided into sections called "Books": I: The Shimerdas; II: The Hired Girls; III: Lena Lingard; IV: The Pioneer Woman's Story; V: Cuzak's Boys.

== Plot summary ==
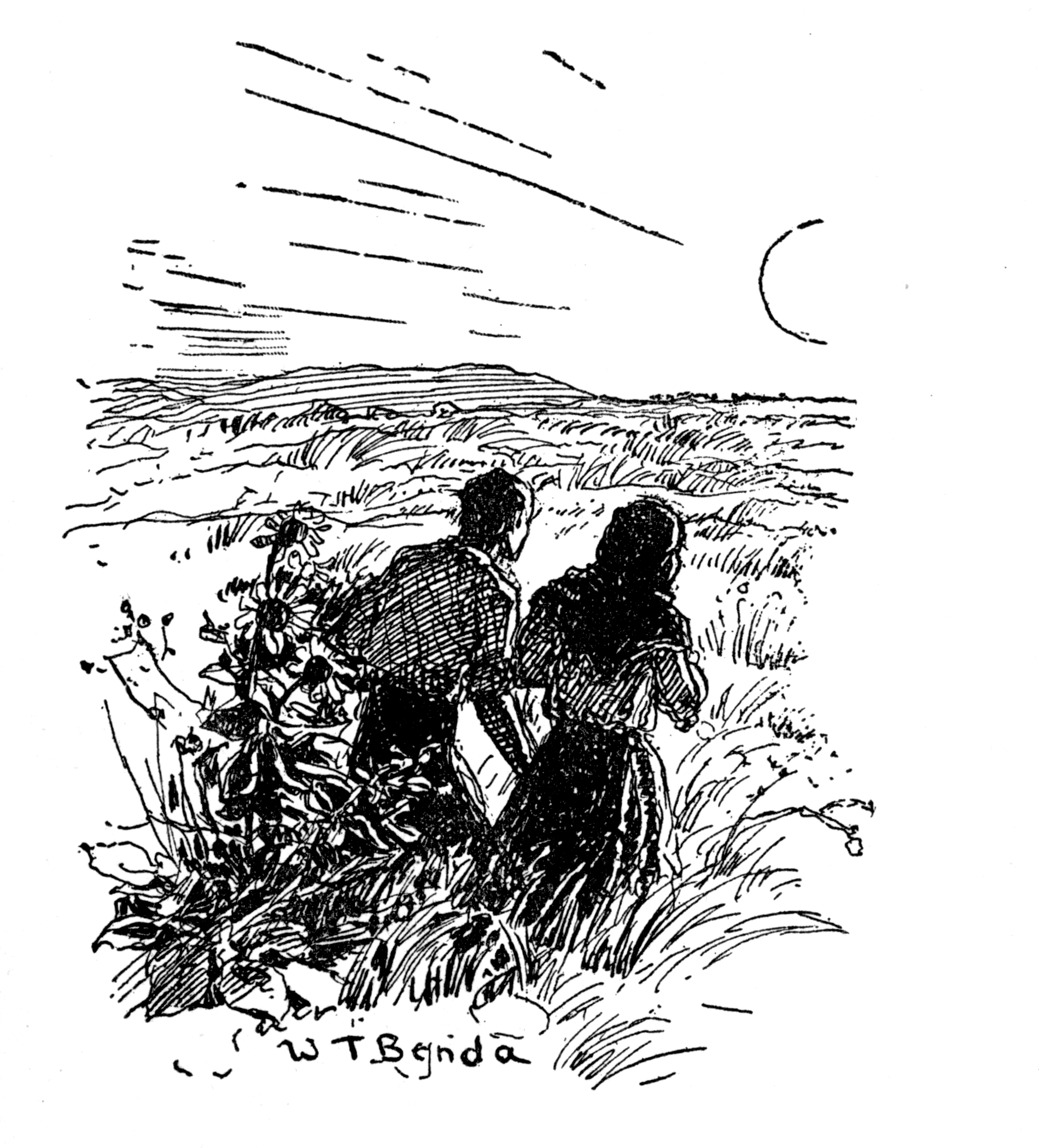
Jim and Ántonia (illustration from a 1924 edition)

Orphaned Jim Burden rides the trains from Virginia to the fictional settlement of Black Hawk, Nebraska, where he will live with his paternal grandparents. Jake, a farmhand from Virginia, rides with the 10-year-old boy. On the same train, headed to the same destination, is the Shimerda family from Bohemia. Jim lives with his grandparents in the home they have built, helping as he can with chores to ease the labor on the others. The home has the dining room and kitchen downstairs, like a basement, with small windows at the top of the walls, an arrangement quite different from Jim's home in Virginia. The sleeping quarters and parlor are at ground level. The Shimerda family paid for a homestead which proves to have no home on it, just a cave in the earth, and not much of the land broken for cultivation. The two families are nearest neighbors to each other in a sparsely settled land. Ántonia, the elder daughter in the Shimerda family, is a few years older than young Jim. The two are friends from the start, helped by Mrs. Shimerda asking Jim to teach both her daughters to read English. Ántonia helps Mrs. Burden in her kitchen when she visits, learning more about cooking and housekeeping. The first year is extremely difficult for the Shimerda family, without a proper house in the winter. Mr. Shimerda comes to thank the Burdens for the Christmas gifts given to them, and has a peaceful day with them. He did not want to move from Bohemia, where he had a skilled trade, a home and friends with whom he could play his violin. His wife is sure life will be better for her children in America.

The pressures of the new life are too much for Mr. Shimerda, who kills himself before the winter is finished. The nearest Catholic priest is too far away for last rites. He is buried without formal rites at the corner marker of their homestead, a place that is left alone when the territory is later marked out with section lines and roads. Ántonia stops her lessons and begins to work the land with her older brother. The wood piled up to build their log cabin is made into a house. Jim continues to have adventures with Ántonia when they can, discovering nature around them, alive with color in summer and almost monotone in winter. She is a girl full of life. Deep memories are set in both of them from the adventures they share, including the time Jim killed a long rattlesnake with a shovel they were fetching for Ambrosch, her older brother.

A few years after Jim arrives, his grandparents move to the edge of town, buying a house while renting their farm. Their neighbors, the Harlings, have a housekeeper to help with meals and care of the children. When they need a new housekeeper, Mrs. Burden connects Ántonia with Mrs. Harling, who hires her for good wages. Becoming a town girl is a success, as Ántonia is popular with the children, and learns more about running a household, letting her brother handle the heavy farm chores. She stays in town for a few years, having her worst experience with Mr. and Mrs. Cutter. The couple goes out of town while she is their housekeeper, after Mr. Cutter said something that made Ántonia uncomfortable to stay alone in the house as requested. Jim stays there in her place, only to be surprised by Mr. Cutter returning to molest Ántonia, who he expects will be alone and defenseless. Instead, Jim attacks the intruder, belatedly realizing that it is Mr. Cutter.

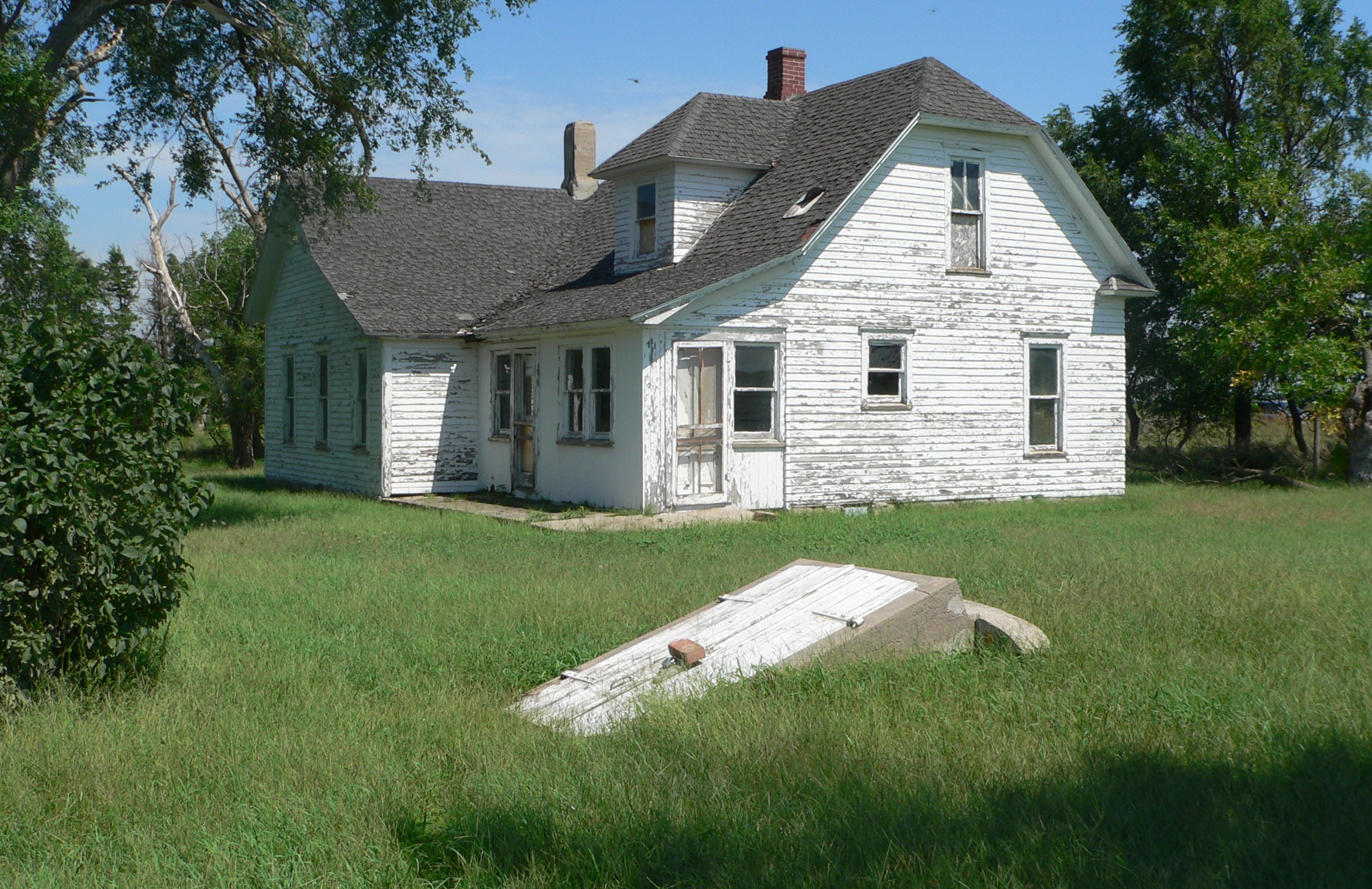
Pavelka house in rural Webster County, Nebraska, setting of "Cuzak's Boys"

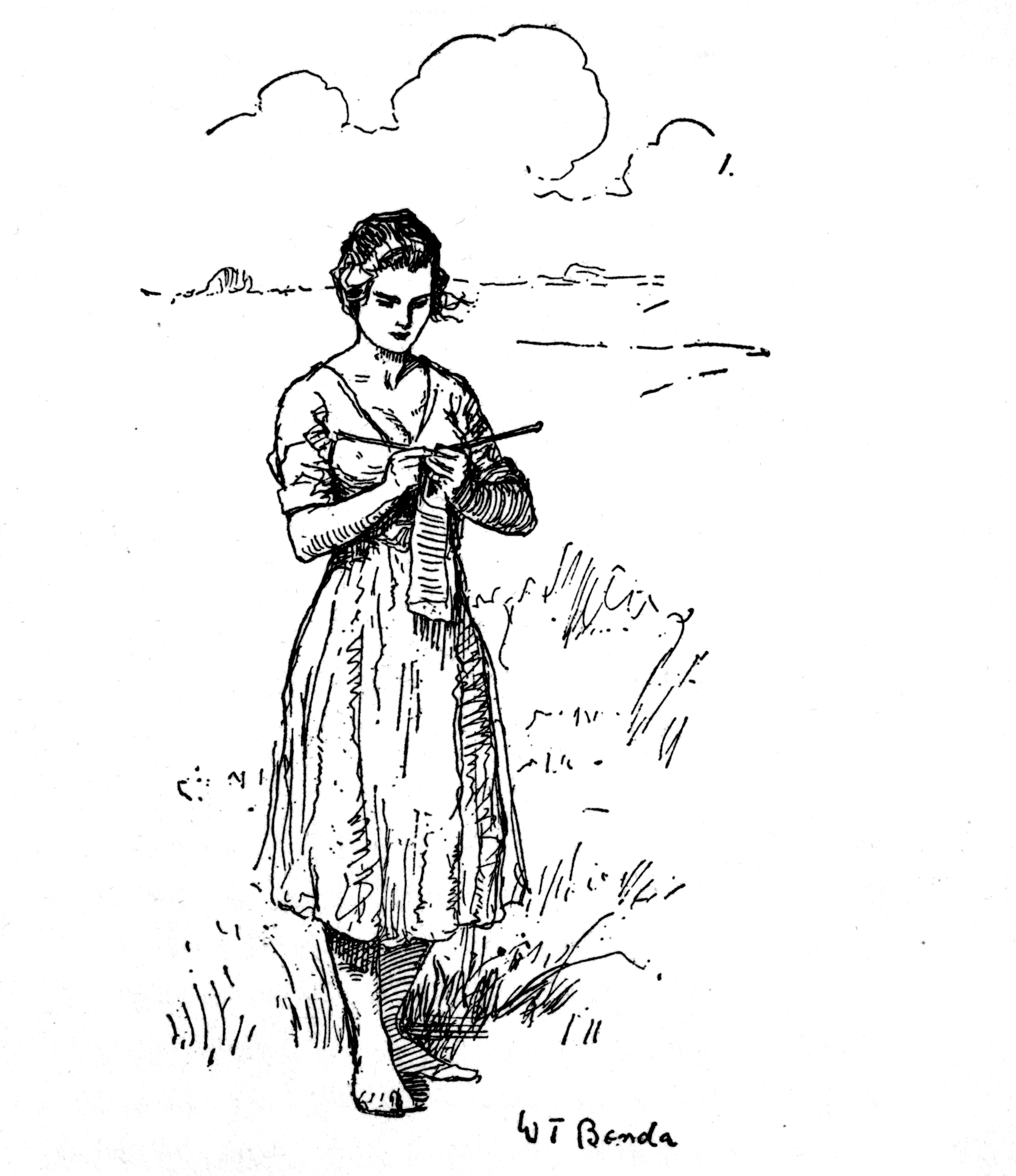
Lena Lingard knitting (illustration from a 1924 edition)

Jim does well in school, the valedictorian of his high school class. He attends the new state university in Lincoln, where his mind is opened to a new intellectual life. In his second year, he finds one of the immigrant farm girls, Lena, is in Lincoln, too, with a successful dressmaking business. He takes her to plays, which they both enjoy. His teacher realizes that Jim is so distracted from his studies, that he suggests Jim come with him to finish his studies at Harvard in Boston. He does, where he then studies the law. He becomes an attorney for one of the western railroads. He keeps in touch with Ántonia, whose life takes a hard turn when the man she loves proposes marriage, but deceives her and leaves her with child. She moves back in with her mother. Years later, Jim visits Ántonia, meeting Anton Cuzak, her husband and father of ten more children, on their farm in Nebraska. He visits with them, getting to know her sons especially. They know all about him, as he features in the stories of their mother's childhood. She is happy with her brood and all the work of a farm wife. Jim makes plans to take her sons on a hunting trip next year.

== Reception and literary significance ==
My Ántonia was enthusiastically received in 1918 when it was first published. It is considered her first masterpiece and placed Cather in the forefront of novelists. Cather was praised for bringing the American West to life and making it personally interesting. It brought place forward almost as if it were one of the characters, while at the same time playing upon the universality of the emotions, which in turn promoted regional American literature as a valid part of mainstream literature.

"As Cather intended, there is no plot in the usual sense of the word. Instead, each book contains thematic contrasts." The novel was a departure from the focus on wealthy families in American literature; "it was a radical aesthetic move for Cather to feature lower-class, immigrant 'hired girls.'"

Cather also makes a number of comments concerning her views on women's rights, and there are many disguised sexual metaphors in the text.

My Ántonia is a selection of The Big Read, the community-wide reading program of The National Endowment for the Arts. For the communities and books in the program since 2007, see History of the program since 2007.

Writing in February 2020, critic and essayist Robert Christgau called My Ántonia a "magnificent, still too obscure novel" and said it "scrupulously documents the facts and foibles of farming as way of life and means of production, although not in the detail of O Pioneers!"

In March 2021, author and columnist Rebecca Traister was asked by New York Times commentator Ezra Klein if there was a book she rereads for the “sheer beauty of the prose”. Traister replied: “For the beauty of the writing, I mean, I would say that my go-to is actually My Antonia by Willa Cather, which is a book I first read in high school and found slightly boring but beautiful, and then read again in my 20s and was just totally enraptured by and then have gone back to again and again and again as a beautiful piece of writing.”

== Publication history ==
Although Cather's sometimes-editor Viola Roseboro' has been credited with having shaped the novel after it was rejected by publishers, a 2026 essay in the Willa Cather Review shows that this could not have happened, for multiple reasons, including that Houghton-Mifflin purchased the novel from Cather sight unseen. Literary scholar Scott Reynolds traced the misinformation to an anecdote told by George Madden Martin, which was repeated in Jane Kirkland Graham's 1955 biography of Roseboro', Viola, The Duchess of New Dorp; he further showed that the circumstances described in Martin's anecdote were applicable to Margaret Culkin Banning's unpublished novel Barbara Lives, and posited that Martin conflated the two novels.

The 1918 version of My Antonia begins with an Introduction in which an author-narrator, supposed to be Cather herself, converses with her adult friend, Jim Burden, during a train journey. Jim is now a successful New York lawyer but trapped in an unhappy and childless marriage to a wealthy, activist woman. Cather agreed with her publisher at Houghton Mifflin to cut that introduction when a revised edition of the novel was published in 1926. A brief introduction with Jim taking that train ride, speaking with an unnamed woman who also knew Ántonia about writing about her, is included in the version at Project Gutenberg.

== Allusions to the novel ==
Douglas Sirk's film The Tarnished Angels makes reference to My Ántonia as the last book read 12 years earlier by heroine LaVerne, played by Dorothy Malone. She discovers the book in the apartment of the alcoholic reporter Burke Devlin, played by Rock Hudson. After LaVerne's husband, Roger, (played by Robert Stack), dies in an airplane racing accident, Burke Devlin sends LaVerne and her son, Jack, on a plane to Chicago, which will connect them to their next flight to Nebraska to start a new life. In the final scene, as LaVerne boards her plane, Burke hands LaVerne the book My Ántonia.

Emmylou Harris' 2000 album Red Dirt Girl features the wistful song "My Ántonia", as a duet with Dave Matthews. Harris wrote the song from Jim's perspective as he reflects on his long lost love.

The French songwriter and singer Dominique A wrote a song inspired by the novel, called "Antonia" (from the LP Auguri, 2001).

In Richard Powers' 2006 novel The Echo Maker, the character Mark Schluter reads My Ántonia on the recommendation of his nurse, who notes that it is "[A] very sexy story. ... About a young Nebraska country boy who has the hots for an older woman" (page 240).

In Anton Shammas' 1986 novel Arabesques, the autobiographical character of Anton reads My Ántonia on the plane to a writers' workshop in Iowa. It is the first novel he ever read, and he expects Iowa to have the same grass "the color of wine stains" that Cather describes of Nebraska.

Dogfish Head Brewery in Milton, Delaware brews a continually-hopped imperial pilsner named My Ántonia.

In the introduction of his New Year's Day opinion piece entitled "2019: The Year of the Wolves" in The New York Times, David Brooks evoked Pavel's deathbed story (Note: Early in the story, Peter and Pavel are deeply in debt to Wick Cutter, who is known in Black Hawk for lending money. Ántonia and Jim accompany Ántonia's father to visit Pavel after he is fatally injured during the construction of a barn. Pavel shares his deathbed confession with them. After Pavel dies, Peter leaves Black Hawk.) from My Ántonia (Note: Ántonia's father befriended the two Russians, Pavel and Peter.) of how he and Peter (Note: In his 2009 article in the Great Plains Quarterly, Robin Chen wrote that the names, Peter and Pavel, are those of "stock characters in Russian folktales".) had been banished from their village in Ukraine for throwing a bride and groom to the wolves to save their own lives when the six sledges of the inebriated bridal party were attacked by about 30 wolves. (Note: Cohen also noted Cather's depiction of wolves is not based on verifiable sources on the behaviour of real wolves. People often overestimate the size of packs of wolves and individual wolves.) Pavel, who was the friend of the groom, had unsuccessfully attempted to convince the groom to save himself too by sacrificing his bride, but the groom fought to protect her. When the two sole survivors returned along to the village, they became pariahs, cast out of their own village and everywhere they went. "Pavel's own mother would not look at him. They went away to strange towns, but when people learned where they came from, they were always asked if they knew the two men who had fed the bride to the wolves. Wherever they went, the story followed them." This is how they came to settle in Black Hawk on the Nebraska prairie. Brooks compares 2019 to that Russian winter in the 19th century where it was known that wolves have been attacking humans, and a vulnerable wedding party that is a "bit drunk" is being led by two men who are willing to do anything to survive, including throwing their friend and his wife to the wolves. He foresees the upcoming year as one "where good people lay low and where wolves are left free to prey on the weak". In his deathbed confession, Pavel explained, "...the ones who do the sacrificing, who throwaway the baggage — bodies, loyalties, allegiances — are the ones who survive."

In Barbara Kingsolver's 2018 novel Unsheltered, a main character is named Willa, after Willa Cather. A paragraph of My Ántonia is quoted in Kingsolver's novel in the context of a dead woman wanting it read at her funeral.

In Bret Stephens' opinion piece in The New York Times, July 19, 2019, titled ”The Perfect Antidote to Trump – Willa Cather knew what made America great” Stephens wrote that Willa Cather's My Ántonia is “a book for our times—and the perfect antidote to our President.” “My Ántonia becomes an education in what it means to be American.” We need to recall “what we’re really about, starting by rereading My Ántonia.”

== Adaptations ==
=== Television ===
My Antonia, a 1995 made-for-television movie, was adapted from the novel.

=== Radio ===
An audio dramatisation written by Kate Clanchy was broadcast on BBC Radio 4 in March 2026, starring Danny Mahoney, Lorelei King and Vera Graziadei. It was produced and directed by Amber Barnfather.

=== Stage ===
The Illusion Theater in Minneapolis, MN, staged an adaptation of My Ántonia by playwright Allison Moore and original music by Roberta Carlson in 2010. The production received an Ivey Award, and toured Minnesota in 2012, 2013, and Nebraska in 2019.

The Celebration Company at The Station Theatre in Urbana, Illinois, performed a stage adaptation of My Ántonia in December 2011. The adaptation was written by Celebration Company member Jarrett Dapier.

Book-It Repertory Theatre produced an original stage adaptation of My Ántonia in December 2018. Adapted by Annie Lareau, it ran from November 29-December 30, 2018 at the Center Theater in Seattle, WA. Seattle Weekly praised the production, saying, "...with the current administration’s racial fearmongering as a goad, Book-It’s exploring yet another aspect of Cather’s 1915 novel My Ántonia, as adapted and directed by Annie Lareau, mixing racially traditional and nontraditional casting in ways that encourage the audience to view its tale of the immigrant experience in broader terms."

Theater Latte Da in Minneapolis commissioned the world premiere of the musical adaptation of My Antonia, with book by Noah Brody. The 2020 commission was part of the theater's NEXT Generation initiative. The production ran from June 3 - July 19, 2026 at the Ritz theater. The show was conceived by Jessie Austrian, Noah Brody, Kate Kilbane and Dan Moses, with music and lyrics by The Kilbanes. Popularity of the production was so great, that the theater extended the run.

== See also ==
- Pavelka Farmstead

== Bibliography ==
=== Books ===
- Bloom, Harold (editor) (1987) Willa Cather's My Ántonia Chelsea House, New York, ISBN 1-55546-035-6; eleven essays
- Bloom, Harold (editor) (1991) Ántonia Chelsea House, New York, ISBN 0-7910-0950-5; more essays
- Lindemann, Marilee (editor) (2005) The Cambridge Companion to Willa Cather Cambridge University Press, Cambridge, England, ISBN 0-521-82110-X
- Meyering, Sheryl L. (2002) Understanding O pioneers! and My Antonia: A student casebook to issues, sources, and historical documents Greenwood Press, Westport, Connecticut, ISBN 0-313-31390-3
- Murphy, John J. (1989) My Ántonia: The road home Twayne Publishers, Boston, Massachusetts, ISBN 0-8057-7986-8
- O'Brien, Sharon (1987) Willa Cather: The Emerging Voice Oxford University Press, Oxford, England, ISBN 0-19-504132-1
- O'Brien, Sharon (editor) (1999) New essays on Cather's My Antonia Cambridge University Press, Cambridge, England, ISBN 0-521-45275-9
- Rosowski, Susan J. (1989) Approaches to Teaching Cather's My Ántonia Modern Language Association of America, New York, ISBN 0-87352-520-5
- Smith, Christopher (2001) Readings on My Antonia Greenhaven Press, San Diego, California, ISBN 0-7377-0181-1
- Wenzl, Bernhard (2001) Mythologia Americana – Willa Cather’s Nebraska novels and the myth of the frontier Grin, Munich, ISBN 978-3-640-14909-4
- Ying, Hsiao-ling (1999) The Quest for Self-actualization: Female protagonists in Willa Cather's Prairie trilogy Bookman Books, Taipei, Taiwan, ISBN 957-586-795-5

=== Articles ===
- Fetterley, Judith (1986) "My Ántonia, Jim Burden, and the Dilemma of the Lesbian Writer" In Spector, Judith (editor) (1986) Gender Studies: New Directions in Feminist Criticism Bowling Green State University Popular Press, Bowling Green, Ohio, pages 43–59, ISBN 0-87972-351-3; and In Jay, Karla and Glasgow, Joanne (editors) (1990) Lesbian Texts and Contexts: Radical Revisions New York University Press, New York, pages 145–163, ISBN 0-8147-4175-4
- Fischer, Mike (1990) "Pastoralism and Its Discontents: Willa Cather and the Burden of Imperialism" Mosaic (Winnipeg) 23(11): pp. 31–44
- Fisher-Wirth, Ann (1993) "Out of the Mother: Loss in My Ántonia" Cather Studies 2: pp. 41–71
- Gelfant, Blanche H. (1971) "The Forgotten Reaping-Hook: Sex in My Ántonia" American Literature 43: pp. 60–82
- Giannone, Richard (1965) "Music in My Ántonia" Prairie Schooner 38(4); covered in Giannone, Richard (1968) Music in Willa Cather's Fiction University of Nebraska Press, Lincoln, Nebraska, pages 116–122, OCLC 598716
- Holmes, Catherine D. (1999) "Jim Burden's Lost Worlds: Exile in My Ántonia" Twentieth-Century Literature 45(3): pp. 336–346
- Lambert, Deborah G. (1982) "The Defeat of a Hero: Autonomy and Sexuality in My Ántonia" American Literature 53(4): pp. 676–690
- Millington, Richard H. (1994) "Willa Cather and "The Storyteller": Hostility to the Novel in My Ántonia" American Literature 66(4): pp. 689–717
- Prchal, Tim (2004) "The Bohemian Paradox: My Antonia and Popular Images of Czech Immigrants" MELUS (Society for the Study of the Multi- Ethnic Literature of the United States) 29(2): pp. 3–25
- Riordan, Kevin (2023) "The Stage Properties of Willa Cather's Theatre-Fiction" in Wolfe, Graham (editor) (2023) The Routledge Companion to Theatre-Fiction, Routledge: pp. 80–88.
- Tellefsen, Blythe (1999) "Blood in the Wheat: Willa Cather's My Antonia" Studies in American Fiction 27(2): pp. 229–244
- Urgo, Joseph (1997) "Willa Cather and the Myth of American Migration" College English 59(2): pp. 206–217
- Yukman, Claudia (1988) "Frontier Relationships in Willa Cather's My Ántonia" Pacific Coast Philology 23(1/2): pp. 94–105
