= Ira A. Jackson =

American academic

Ira A. Jackson was the director of the Center for Business and Government at Harvard Kennedy School at Harvard University. Earlier, he was senior associate dean of Harvard's Kennedy School during its formative growth years. Jackson was also executive vice president of BankBoston. From 1983 to 1987 he served as Massachusetts Commissioner of Revenue, and was chief of staff for Boston Mayor Kevin White.

== Biography ==
He is a graduate of Harvard College (Class of 1970), holds a Master in Public Administration from Harvard Kennedy School at Harvard University, and is a graduate of the Advanced Management Program at the Harvard Business School.

Jackson was the former Dean and Professor of Management at the Claremont Graduate University's Peter F. Drucker and Masatoshi Ito Graduate School of Management.

Jackson was the president and CEO of the Arizona State University Foundation. Earlier, he was appointed as the first president and CEO of The Arthur M. Blank Family Foundation. He was a Senior Fellow at Harvard’s Center for Public Leadership (2004–2006). He was Vice Provost of the University of Massachusetts Boston and Dean of the John W. McCormack School of Policy and Global Studies. He served as executive vice president of Brandeis University.

Jackson is a co-founder of the Civic Action Project, a program designed to accelerate social progress and change by equipping diverse next-generation leaders with the hard and soft skills they need to succeed in public policy. In 2019, Jackson was a Visiting Lecturer at Harvard University where he taught a course on leadership and social change, focusing on issues of race, class, and social justice using Boston as a case study.

== Publications ==
- Profits with Principles: Seven Strategies for Delivering Value with Values, 2003 (coauthor), a book about social responsibility in corporate investment.
