= List of residences of American writers =

Listed below are notable or preserved private residences in the United States of significant American writers. These writers' homes, where many Pulitzer Prize-winning books were written, also inspired the settings of many notable poems, short stories and novels.

== Alabama ==
Writer	Image	Residence	Years	Coordinates	Notes
F. Scott Fitzgerald		The Scott and Zelda Fitzgerald Museum	1931–1932	Montgomery; 32.35883°N 86.29227°W	Fitzgerald worked on the novel Tender Is The Night in this house. This is the last home the Fitzeralds lived together as a family.
Truman Capote		The Faulk home site	1927–1933	Monroeville; 31.52395°N 87.32389°W	Capote lived with his mother's relatives in the Faulk home from 1927 to 1933 and spent several summers here after 1933.

== California ==
Writer	Image	Residence	Years	Coordinates	Notes
Robinson Jeffers		Tor House	1919–1962	Carmel; 36°32′31.5″N 121°55′56″W	Jeffers wrote all his major works of poetry in this house.
Jack London		Wolf house and ranch	1905–1913	Glen Ellen; 38°21′2″N 122°32′35″W	London's most famous novel is The Call of the Wild. The 26-room mansion, which London had built, was destroyed in a fire in 1913 shortly before London and his wife were to occupy the house.
Eugene O'Neill		O'Neill home	1937–1944	Danville; 37°49′28″N 122°1′47″W	O'Neill wrote several plays in this house, including The Iceman Cometh and A Moon for the Misbegotten.
Upton Sinclair		Sinclair house	1942–1966	Monrovia; 34°9′44″N 118°0′0″W	Sinclair, who won the Pulitzer Prize for Fiction in 1943, wrote many of his later novels in this house.
John Steinbeck		Steinbeck house	1902–1919	Salinas; 36°40′36″N 121°39′29″W	Steinbeck's birthplace and childhood home. He completed The Red Pony and Tortilla Flat here in the 1930s.

== Connecticut ==
Writer	Image	Residence	Years	Coordinates	Notes
Eugene O'Neill		Monte Cristo Cottage	1900–1920	New London; 41°19′55″N 72°5′46.5″W	O'Neill's summer childhood home and setting of two of his plays.
Mark Twain (1)		Twain House	1874–1891	Hartford; 41°46′1.5″N 72°42′5.0″W	Twain wrote many of his most popular novels in this house.
Harriet Beecher Stowe (1)		Stowe House	1873–1896	Hartford; 41°46′1.14″N 72°42′2.81″W	Stowe spent the last 23 years of her life in this house. Stowe is best remembered for her influential and best selling antil-slavery novel, Uncle Tom's Cabin (1852).
Noah Webster		Webster house	1758–1774	West Hartford; 41°44′46.27″N 72°44′47.4″W	Webster's birthplace. He lived in the house until he left for college.

== Florida ==
Writer	Image	Residence	Years	Coordinates	Notes
Ernest Hemingway		Key West house	1931–1939	Key West; 24.55143°N 81.80061°W	Hemingway wrote several of his best-selling novels in this house, including To Have and Have Not. The site is also known for its dozens of six-toed cats, known locally as Hemingway cats.
Zora Neale Hurston		Zora Neale Hurston House	1957–1960	Fort Pierce; 27°27′39″N 80°20′31″W	The only surviving home of Hurston, legendary writer of the Harlem Renaissance. Her published work includes Their Eyes Were Watching God and Moses, Man of the Mountain.
Jack Kerouac		Jack Kerouac House	1957–1958	Orlando; 28°33′52″N 81°23′30″W	American novelist and poet of the Beat Generation, Kerouac wrote The Dharma Bums in this small cottage.
Marjorie Kinnan Rawlings		Cross Creek house	1929–1953	Cross Creek; 29°28′53″N 82°9′37″W	The Pulitzer Prize winning novel, The Yearling, was written by Rawlings in her Florida cracker-style house.

== Georgia ==
Name	Image	Residence	Years	Coordinates	Notes
Joel Chandler Harris		Wren's Nest	1881–1908	Atlanta; 33.73764°N 84.42219°W	Harris is the author of the legendary Uncle Remus tales.
Carson McCullers (1)		Carson McCullers Childhood Home	1917–1934	Columbus; 32.4751202°N 84.9565572°W	Born Lula Carson Smith, McCullers gained literary acclaim at the young age of 23 with her first novel, The Heart is a Lonely Hunter. The writer's childhood home is now owned by Columbus State University.
Margaret Mitchell		Margaret Mitchell House and Museum	1925–1932	Atlanta; 33°46′53.02″N 84°23′4.62″W	Mitchell wrote the Pulitzer Prize winning-novel Gone with the Wind here.
Flannery O'Connor (1)		O'Connor Childhood Home	1925–1938	Savannah; 32.07251°N 81.09146°W	Birthplace of O'Connor; the museum is open to the public.
Flannery O'Connor (2)		Andalusia farm	1951–1964	Milledgeville; 33.12526°N 83.26775°W	This area of Georgia was the setting for many of O'Connor's short stories.

== Illinois ==
Name	Image	Residence	Years	Coordinates	Notes
Ernest Hemingway		Birthplace of Ernest Hemingway	1899–1905	Oak Park; 41.892778°N 87.795081°W	Birthplace and childhood home of legendary American novelist and journalist who was awarded the 1954 Nobel Prize in Literature. The house is also a museum open to the public.
Vachel Lindsay		Vachel Lindsay House	1879–1931	Springfield; 39.79616°N 89.64964°W	American poet known for his performance poetry.
Carl Sandburg		Carl Sandburg State Historic Site	1878–1896	Galesburg; 40.93650°N 90.36583°W	Birthplace of the Pulitzer Prize-winning poet and biographer.

== Louisiana ==
Name	Image	Place	Years	Coordinates	Notes
John Kennedy Toole		Toole-Hecker House	1937–1969	New Orleans; 29°56′29″N 90°07′50″W	Toole lived in this house his entire life; currently a private residence, though a bronze plaque outside the house denotes its history.
Robert Penn Warren		Robert Penn Warren House	1941–1942	Prairieville; 30°18′30″N 90°58′25″W	The private residence, known as Twin Oaks, is listed on the National Register of Historic Places.

== Maine ==
Name	Image	Residence	Years	Coordinates	Notes
Stephen King		Stephen and Tabitha King home	1980–present	Bangor; 44.80251°N 68.78501°W	Home of best-selling author of horror novels including Carrie and The Shining, this Victorian mansion lies in Bangor's Whitney Park Historic District.
Sarah Orne Jewett		Jewett-Eastman House	1850-?	South Berwick43°14′6″N 70°48′33″W	Jewett's childhood home. She is best known for "The Country of the Pointed Firs" (1896) and “A White Heron,” (1886).
Harriet Beecher Stowe (2)		Stowe House	1850–1852	Brunswick; 43°54′46″N 69°57′39″W	Stowe wrote "Uncle Tom's Cabin" (1852) in this house.
Henry Wadsworth Longfellow		Wadsworth-Longfellow House	1807–1842	Portland; 43°39′25″N 70°15′37″W	Childhood home of legendary American poet, whose work includes "Paul Revere's Ride" and "The Song of Hiawatha".

== Maryland ==
Name	Image	Residence	Years	Coordinates	Notes
H.L. Mencken		H. L. Mencken House	1883–1956	Baltimore; 39°17′15.2″N 76°38′30.6″W	The house was opened to the public in 2019.
Rachel Carson (1)		Carson House, Colesville	1956–1964	Colesville; 39°2′48″N 77°0′2″W	Carson wrote her legendary work, "Silent Spring", in this house in 1962.
Edgar Allan Poe		Poe House, Baltimore	1833–1835	Baltimore; 39.29150°N 76.63319°W	Poe moved into his aunt Elizabeth's rental house in 1833 after he graduated from Westpoint Military Academy.
Gertrude Stein		David Bachrach House	1892	Baltimore; 39°18′50.6″N 76°38′9.5″W	The Bachrach house, also known as the Gertrude Stein house, is not open to the public. Stein was a niece of Mrs. David Bachrach.

== Massachusetts ==
Name	Image	Residence	Years	Location	Notes
E. E. Cummings		E. E. Cummings House	1894–1917	Cambridge; 42°22′43.6″N 71°6′38.5″W	The childhood home of the author and poet, Cummings lived here until he graduated from Harvard University in 1917.
Edward Gorey		The Elephant House	1986–2000	Cape Cod; 41°42′19″N 70°14′33″W	The house is a museum displaying Gorey's life and work.
Emily Dickinson		Emily Dickinson Museum	1855–1886	Amherst; 42°22′34″N 72°30′52″W	After Dickinson's death, 1800 poems were discovered in her room by her sister, Lavinia.
Louisa May Alcott (1)		The Wayside formerly known as 'Hillside'	1844–1848	Concord; 42°27′32″N 71°19′59″W	Alcott used many of the experiences she and her sisters shared in this house in her book, Little Women. Nathaniel Hawthorne purchased the house from the Alcotts when they moved to Boston in 1848.
Louisa May Alcott (2)		Orchard House	1858–1877	Concord; 42.4589°N 71.3351°W	This home is adjacent to Nathaniel Hawthorne's home, The Wayside. Alcott wrote Little Women in this house (1868–1869).
Ralph Waldo Emerson		Ralph Waldo Emerson House	1835–1882	Concord; 42°27′27″N 71°20′39″W	American essayist, philosopher and poet, Emerson and his wife moved to this house after their wedding. He lived here the rest of his life.
Henry Longfellow		Longfellow National Historic Site	1843–1882	Cambridge; 42°22′36″N 71°07′35″W	Before poet Longfellow resided here, it was the first headquarters of George Washington during the American Revolution. Longfellow lived in the house for almost 50 years.
Herman Melville		Arrowhead (Herman Melville House)	1850–1863	Pittsfield; 42°24′55.4″N 73°14′55.7″W	Melville wrote his most famous novels at Arrowhead.
Nathaniel Hawthorne (1)		Nathaniel Hawthorne Birthplace	1804–1808	Salem; 42°31′17.36″N 70°53′03.11″W	Hawthorne and his mother moved from the house after his father died in 1808.
Nathaniel Hawthorne (2)		The Wayside	1852–1869	Concord; 42°27′32″N 71°19′59″W	Wayside was the home to Hawthorne, Louisa May Alcott and Margaret Sidney. Hawthorne wrote The Scarlet Letter and the House of the Seven Gables here.
Henry David Thoreau		Thoreau–Alcott House	1850–1862	Concord; 42°27′30″N 71°21′30″W	Thoreau moved to the house with his family in 1850 and lived here until his death. The house is privately owned.
Edith Wharton		The Mount	1902–1911	Lenox; 42.3311°N 73.2820°W	Wharton designed both the house and garden, inspired by works of art.

== Michigan ==
Name	Image	Residence	Years	Coordinates	Notes
Ernest Hemingway		Windemere Cottage	1900–1921	Petoskey; 45.28081°N 85.00108°W	The cottage was used during Hemingway's childhood as his family's summer home. Hemingway and his first wife, Hadley Richardson spent their honeymoon in the cottage. It is a private residence.
Theodore Roethke		Roethke Houses	1911–1925	Saginaw; 43°25′00″N 83°59′14″W	The house at 1759 Gratiot was known as The Stone House and was built by Roethke's uncle Carl. The house next door, at 1805 Gratiot, is Roethke's childhood home, and was built by his father, Otto. Roethke's sister, June, lived in the house until her death in 1997.

== Minnesota ==
Name	Image	Residence	Years	Coordinates	Notes
F. Scott Fitzgerald		F. Scott Fitzgerald House	1918–1920	Saint Paul; 44°56′29.5″N 93°7′30.5″W	Fitzgerald re-wrote the draft of his first novel, This Side of Paradise in this house.
Sinclair Lewis		Sinclair Lewis Boyhood Home	1889–1902	Sauk Centre; 45°44′14″N 94°57′26.5″W	Lewis's boyhood home. He is the first American to receive the Nobel Prize in Literature.

== Mississippi ==
Name	Image	Residence	Years	Coordinates	Notes
William Faulkner		Rowan Oak	1930–1962	Oxford; 34.3598°N 89.5247°W	Faulkner did many of the renovations on the house. The penciled plot of his Pulitzer Prize–winning novel A Fable, can still be seen on the plaster walls of his office.
Eudora Welty		Eudora Welty House	1925–2001	Jackson; 32°19′7.7″N 90°10′13.22″W	Welty's parents built the house in 1925. This is where she lived here for nearly 80 years, entertained friends and family, worked in her garden and wrote her award-winning novels and short stories.

== Missouri ==
Name	Image	Residence	Years	Coordinates	Notes
Maya Angelou		Maya Angelou Birthplace	1928–1931	St. Louis; 38°37′22″N 90°13′47″W	The birthplace of writer Maya Angelou.
Kate Chopin		Kate Chopin House (St. Louis, Missouri)	1928–1931	St. Louis; 38°38′35″N 90°14′56″W	American author best known for her novel, The Awakening (1899).
Mark Twain (2)		Mark Twain boyhood home	1844–1853	Hannibal; 39°42′43″N 91°21′28″W	Twain's life in Hannibal inspired his writing of The Adventures of Huckleberry Finn and Tom Sawyer.
Laura Ingalls Wilder		Laura Ingalls Wilder House	1896–1957	Mansfield; 37.10160°N 92.55678°W	Wilder wrote the Little House on the Prairie books while living in the house.

== Nebraska ==
Name	Image	Place	Years	Coordinates	Notes
Willa Cather (1)		Willa Cather House	1883–1890	Red Cloud; 40°5′16″N 98°31′16″W	Cather's childhood home. Her first two homes, the Willa Cather Birthplace and Willow Shade are in Virginia. She lived in the Nebraska home until she left for college in 1890.

== New Hampshire ==
Name	Image	Residence	Years	Coordinates	Notes
Robert Frost (1)		Robert Frost Farm (Derry, New Hampshire)	1900–1911	Derry; 42°52′18″N 71°17′42″W	Frost wrote the majority of his poems from A Boy's Will (1913) and North of Boston (1914) in this house.
Robert Frost (2)		The Frost Place	1911–1920	Franconia; 44°12′46″N 71°45′27″W	The family lived in the house until 1920 and then spent the next 20 years spending their summers here.
H.A. Rey and Margaret Rey		The Rey Cultural Center (Curious George Cottage)	c.1950s-1977	Waterville Valley; 43°56′47″N 71°30′10″W	The Reys wrote several Curious George books at the cottage; H.A. Rey's astronomy books were revised while at the cottage due to the lack of light pollution.

== New Jersey ==
Name	Image	Place	Years	Coordinates	Notes
Stephen Crane		Arburtus Cottage	1883–1892	Asbury; 40.22404°N 74.00679°W	Crane began his writing career in this Asbury Park house.
Walt Whitman		Walt Whitman House	1884–1892	Camden; 39°56′33″N 75°7′26″W	The only house that Whitman owned.
William Carlos Williams		William Carlos Williams House	1913–1963	Rutherford; 40°49′36″N 74°6′18″W	The poet and physician lived and worked in this house for 50 years.

== New York ==
Name	Image	Residence	Years	Coordinates	Notes
James Baldwin		James Baldwin Residence	1965–1987	New York City; 40.77764°N 73.98043°W	Baldwin bought the building in 1965. He lived in apartment B; his mother lived above him in apartment 1B and his sister lived in apartment 4A. Author Toni Morrison lived in the building for a short time.
Washington Irving		Sunnyside (Tarrytown, New York)	1835–1859	Tarrytown; 41°02′51.2″N 73°52′11.6″W	This is the first home that Irving bought for himself and he lived here until his death in 1859. The house and gardens have been restored to how Irving's home looked the 1850s.
Langston Hughes		Langston Hughes House	1947–1967	Harlem, New York City; 40.80745°N 73.94051°W	Hughes lived and worked on the top floor of the house. Here, Hughes wrote Montage of a Dream Deferred and I Wonder as I Wander. The house is currently open for events.
James Weldon Johnson		James Weldon Johnson Residence	1925–1938	Harlem, New York City; 40°48′55″N 73°56′35″W	Legendery poet, novelist, songwriter, and civil rights activist. During the Harlem Renaissance, Johnson gained acclaim for his writing on Black culture.
Herman Melville		Herman Melville House	1838–1847	Lansingburgh; 42°46′23″N 73°40′45″W	The family moved to this small town and house from New York City after the death of Melville's father in 1832 left the family impoverished.
Carson McCullers (2)		Carson McCullers House	1945–1967	South Nyack; 41°5′9″N 73°55′11″W	In this house, McCullers finished The Member of the Wedding and worked on other novels, short stories, plays and poetry. She lived here until her death in 1967.
Edna St. Vincent Millay		Steepletop	1925–1950	Austerlitz; 42°19′17.30″N 73°26′39.15″W	The house is no longer open to the public.
Edgar Allan Poe		Edgar Allan Poe Cottage	1846–1849	The Bronx, 40°51′55″N 73°53′40″W	Poe's, wife, Virginia died in the home after a long illness. He wrote Annabel Lee The Cask of Amontillado, The Bells and other poems and short stories here.
Mark Twain (3)		Quarry Farm	1870–1900	Elmira; 42°6′47″N 76°46′56″W	Twain's family visited his wife's family home every summer for 30 years. Three of his daughters were born here. Today, it is used as a retreat for Mark Twain scholars.
Walt Whitman		Walt Whitman Birthplace	1819–1824	West Hills; 40°49′1.38″N 73°24′44.39″W	Whitman's father, who was a carpenter, built the two-story farmhouse by hand in 1816.

== North Carolina ==
Name	Image	Place	Years	Coordinates	Notes
Carl Sandburg		Carl Sandburg Home	1945–1967	Hendersonville; 35°16′17″N 82°26′50″W	Sandburg moved here with his family for a quieter environment for his writing. His wife raised what are now a historic breed of dairy goats on the farm.
Thomas Wolfe		Thomas Wolfe House	1906–1916	Asheville; 35°35′51″N 82°33′03″W	Wolfe's childhood home. He used the house for the setting of his first novel, Look Homeward Angel.

== Ohio ==
Name	Image	Residence	Years	Coordinates	Notes
Paul Lawrence Dunbar		Paul Laurence Dunbar House	1904–1906	Dayton; 39°45′27.6″N 84°13′8.2″W	Dunbar bought the house for his mother in 1902, but moved here after he separated from his wife. He suffered from ill health and died in the home in 1906.
Harriet Beecher Stowe (3)		Harriet Beecher Stowe House (Cincinnati, Ohio)	1833–1836	Cincinnati; 39°7′58.88″N 84°29′15.57″W	Henry Ward Beecher, leader in the women's suffrage movement also lived in this house.
James Thurber		Thurber House	1913–1917	Columbus 39.965781°N 82.985215°W	Thurber lived in this house with his family while attending Ohio State University. It is now a museum and literary center for readers & writers.

== Oregon ==
Name	Image	Residence	Years	Coordinates	Notes
Zane Grey		Zane Grey Cabin	1926–1935	42.70179°N 123.80477°W	Grey's famous for his popular novels set in the American West.

== Pennsylvania ==
Name	Image	Residence	Years	Coordinates	Notes
Rachel Carson (2)		Rachel Carson Homestead	1907–1929	Springdale; 40.54663°N 79.78325°W	Carson's birthplace and childhood home. Her 1962 book Silent Spring initiated the modern environmentalist movement.
Pearl S. Buck (1)		Pearl S. Buck House National Historic Landmark	1933–late 1960s	Bucks County; 40°21′36″N 75°13′11″W	Buck was the first American woman to win the Nobel Prize in Literature for her best-selling novel, The Good Earth.
John Updike		John Updike Childhood Home	1932–1945	Shillington, Pennsylvania; 40°18′08″N 75°57′54″W	Birthplace and childhood home of American novelist and two-time Pulitzer Prize winner.

== Tennessee ==
Name	Image	Residence	Years	Coordinates	Notes
Alex Haley		Alex Haley House and Museum	1921–1929	Henning; 35°40′24″N 89°34′35″W	Haley was raised for a time in the house, which is now a museum dedicated to his life and a genealogy center. Haley is buried on the front lawn of the property.

== Texas ==
Name	Image	Residence	Years	Coordinates	Notes
Katherine Ann Porter		Katherine Anne Porter House	1892–1901	Kyle; 29°59′21″N 97°52′46″W	Katherine's family moved to her grandmother's house after Katherine's mother died in 1892. They lived here until her grandmother's death in 1902.
O. Henry		William Sidney Porter House	1893–1895	Austin; 30°15′56.5″N 97°44′20.8″W	Best selling author of the legendary short-stories The Gift of the Magi and The Ransom of Red Chief.

== Washington D.C. ==
Name	Image	Residence	Years	Coordinates	Notes
Frederick Douglass		Frederick Douglass National Historic Site	1877–1895	Kyle; 38°51′48″N 76°59′07″W	Douglass wrote the Life and Times of Frederick Douglass in this house, which he named "Cedar Hill".
Langston Hughes		Langston Hughes House, Washington D.C.	1924–1926	Washington D.C. 30°15′56.5″N 97°44′20.8″W	While living in the Italianate row house, "Hughes won his first poetry competition, and gave his first public readings. He got a contract for his first book of poems from Alfred A. Knopf in New York, finished his book manuscript, and published The Weary Blues in February 1926".

== Vermont ==
Name	Image	Residence	Years	Coordinates	Notes
Robert Frost (3)		Robert Frost Farm (Ripton, Vermont)	1939–1963	Ripton; 43°57′59″N 73°0′17″W	Frost spent summers and part of fall here during the last 30 years of his life.
Robert Frost (4)		Robert Frost Stone House Museum	1920–1929	Shaftsbury; 42.93621°N 73.20953°W	While living in this house, Frost wrote many poems including the famous Stopping by Woods on a Snowy Evening.
Rudyard Kipling		Naulakha	1893–1896	Dummerston; 42°53′55″N 72°33′51″W	Kipling wrote several books in this house, including The Jungle Book and Captain Courageous.

== Virginia ==
Name	Image	Residence	Years	Coordinates	Notes
Willa Cather (2)		Willa Cather Birthplace	1873–1874	Gore; 39°16′3″N 78°19′27″W	The Pulitzer-prize winning author was born in her grandmother, Rachel Boak's home in 1873.
Willa Cather (3)		Willow Shade	1874–1883	Winchester; 39°16′06.7″N 78°18′28.7″W	Cather's family lived in her paternal grandparent's home until they moved to Nebraska in 1883.
Ellen Glasgow		Ellen Glasgow House	1890s–1945	Richmond; 37°32′34″N 77°26′42″W	Awarded the Pulitzer Prize for her novel In This Our Life in 1942, Glasgow lived here from her teen years until her death in 1945.

== West Virginia ==
Name	Image	Residence	Years	Coordinates	Notes
Pearl S. Buck (2)		Pearl S. Buck Birthplace	Hillsboro; 38°8′30″N 80°12′19″W	1892	Birthplace of Pulitzer and Nobel-prize winning author. Buck's parents were Presbyterian missionaries on furlough in this house when she was born. When Buck was five months old, her parents returned with her to China.
