= Kate Chopin House =

Kate Chopin House may refer to:

- Kate Chopin House (Cloutierville, Louisiana), a former U.S. National Historic Landmark and formerly listed on the NRHP in Natchitoches County
- Kate Chopin House (St. Louis, Missouri), NRHP-listed
