= Annemarie Ní Churreáin =

Irish poet

- Education: Trinity College, Dublin
- Occupation: Poet
- Writing career
- Language: Irish

Annemarie Ní Churreáin is an Irish poet from County Donegal.

== Career ==
Ní Churreáin grew up in a place called Cnoc Na Naomh in the north-west of County Donegal.

She was educated at the Oscar Wilde Centre at Trinity College, Dublin. Ní Churreáin is fluent in Irish.

Ní Churreáin has received literary awards from Jack Kerouac House, Akademie Schloss Solitude, and Hawthornden Castle.

In 2016, Ní Churreáin was honoured with the Next Generation Artists Award from Michael D. Higgins on behalf of the Arts Council of Ireland. In 2018, she was awarded the inaugural John Broderick Residency Award by the Arts Council. In 2019, she was named one of two Writers in Residence at Maynooth University in County Kildare.

In addition to her writing practice, Ní Churreáin is a panelist on the Writers in Irish Prisons Scheme and co-founder of the arts collective, "Upstart." In 2007, she established Ireland's first creative arts therapies outreach programme for people in need.

== Bibliography ==
Ní Churreáin's first poetry collection, Bloodroot, was published by Doire Press in October 2017. In 2018 it was shortlisted for the Shine Strong Award in Ireland and for the Julie Suk Award. Her second book, Town, is a special edition letter-press book published by The Salvage Press in 2018.

Ní Churreáin's second full length poetry collection, The Poison Glen, was published by The Gallery Press in 2021 and in 2025 released 'Hymn To All the Restless Girls.'
