= James Weldon Johnson Residence =

Building in Manhattan, New York

- U.S. National Register of Historic Places
- U.S. National Historic Landmark
- U.S. Historic district – Contributing property
- New York State Register of Historic Places
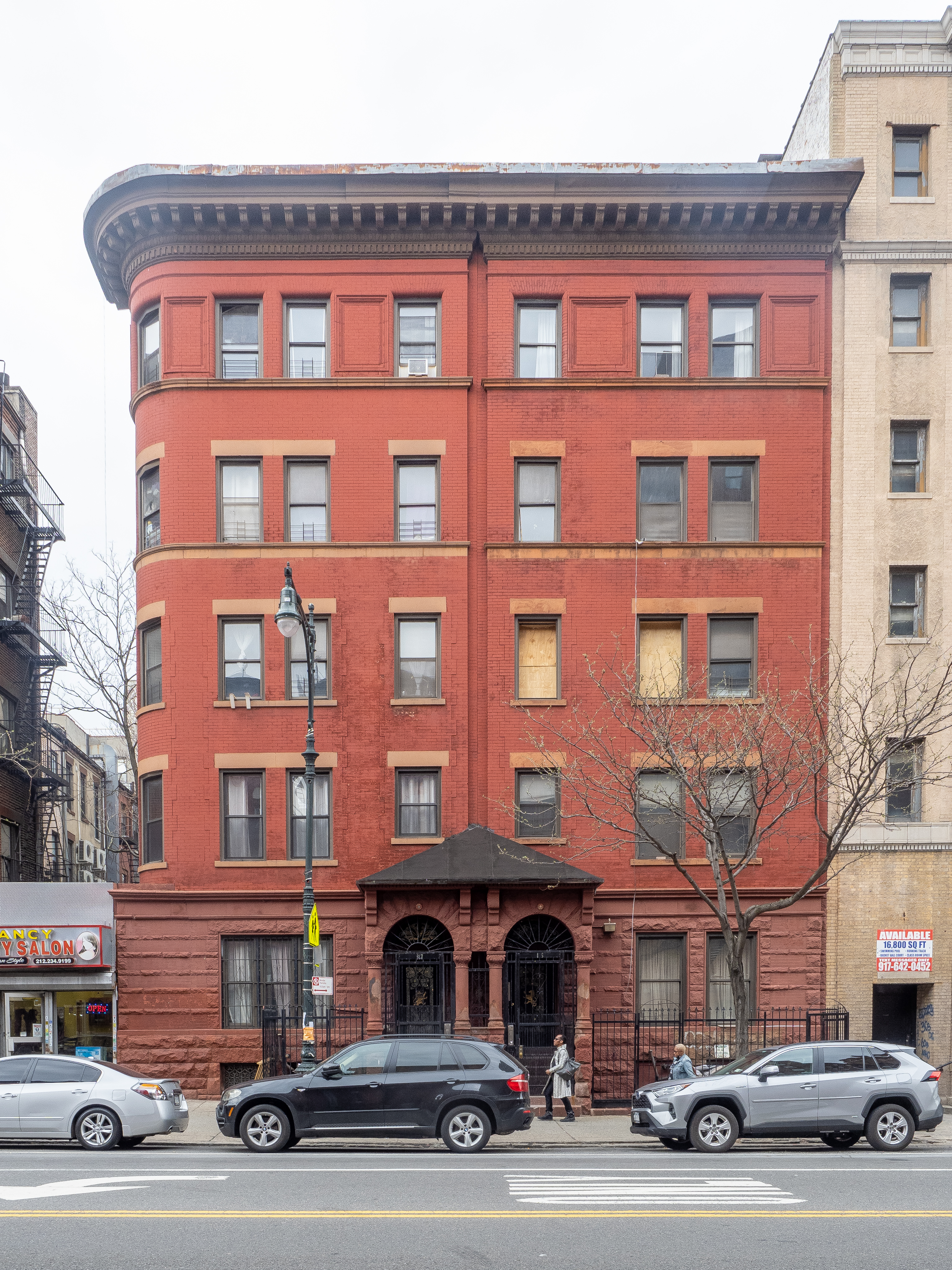

- Location within Manhattan Location within New York Location within the United States
- Location: 187 W. 135th St., Manhattan, New York, US
- Coordinates: 40°48′55″N 73°56′35″W
- Area: less than one acre
- Built: 1925
- Architectural style: Renaissance
- Part of: Central Harlem North Historic District (ID100009934)
- NRHP reference No.: 76001241
- NYSRHP No.: 06101.001798

Significant dates
- Added to NRHP: May 11, 1976
- Designated NHL: May 11, 1976
- Designated NYSRHP: June 23, 1980

The James Weldon Johnson Residence is a historic apartment house located at 187 West 135th Street, Harlem, Manhattan, New York City, New York. It is here where James Weldon Johnson (1871–1938) lived from 1925 until his death. In addition to being a composer, songwriter, and author, he was an outspoken advocate for civil rights, working in various roles at the NAACP, including as its General Secretary during his residency here. The building was declared a National Historic Landmark in 1976.

== Description and history ==
The James Weldon Johnson Residence is located on the north side of West 135th Street, just east of its junction with Seventh Avenue in Manhattan's northern Harlem neighborhood. It is one of a pair of similar five-story brick buildings, which share styling and a party wall. The buildings have Romanesque styling, with that on the left exhibiting a curved corner bay. The buildings share a projecting cornice with modillion blocks, as well as gabled roof over their entrances, which stand on either side of the party wall. The facades are each three bays wide, with sash windows set in rectangular openings with limestone sills and lintels.

James Weldon Johnson occupied one of the units at #187 from 1925 until his death in 1938. Born in Florida in 1871 to middle-class African-Americans, Johnson was educated at Atlanta University, and had a diverse career as an educator, composer, singer, author, and journalist. He was hired by the National Association for the Advancement of Colored People (NAACP) in 1916, and held positions of importance in the organization for the rest of his productive life. He was instrumental in building the organization in the segregated South, and lobbied for anti-lynching legislation. He died in a car accident in 1938.

== See also ==
- List of National Historic Landmarks in New York City
- National Register of Historic Places listings in Manhattan above 110th Street
- List of residences of American writers
