= The Jack Kerouac Writers in Residence Project of Orlando, Inc. =

Nonprofit group in Florida, US

The Jack Kerouac Writers in Residence or Kerouac Project is a registered 501(c)(3) non profit group in Orlando, Florida. The project provides aspiring writers to live in the house that Jack Kerouac lived in while writing his 1958 novel The Dharma Bums, rent free for 3 months.

Kerouac lived in this home at the time On the Road (1957) made him a national sensation, and it was in this home that Kerouac wrote his follow-up, The Dharma Bums, over the course of eleven days and nights. The house represents a critical juncture in Kerouac's life, when the success of On the Road provided him with nationwide critical acclaim and commercial success, and pushed him and the other members of the Beat Generation into the spotlight. The Kerouac House, as it has come to be known, is now a living, literary tribute to Kerouac.

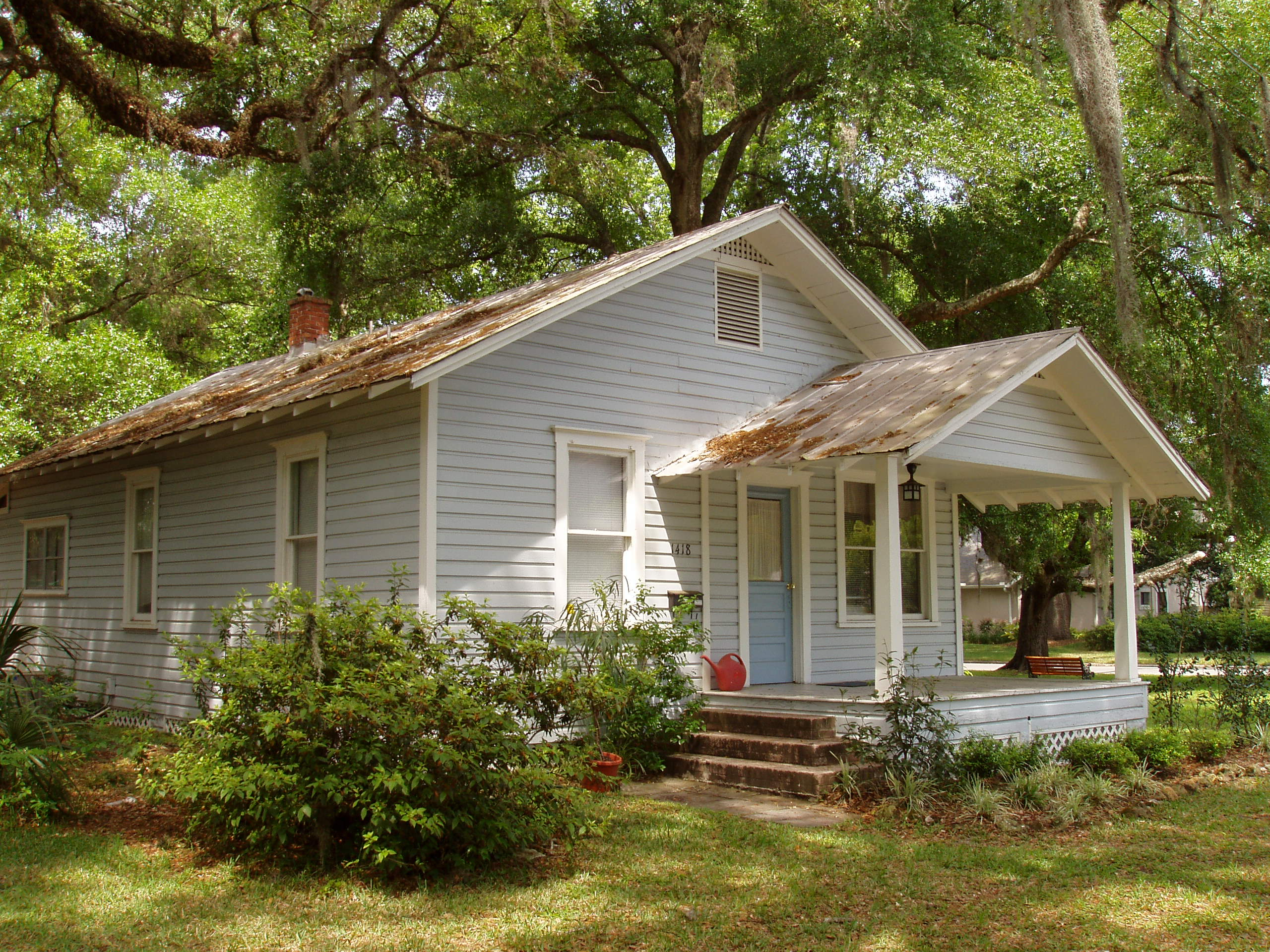
The house in Orlando, Florida where Kerouac lived and wrote The Dharma Bums and aspiring writers stay now.

== History ==
The Kerouac Project began with a chance discovery by Bob Kealing, a reporter with the Orlando area NBC affiliate and freelance writer. In 1996 he learned that Jack Kerouac had been living in a c. 1920 Orlando cottage when his classic work On the Road was published to worldwide acclaim in 1957 and where he actually typed the original manuscript of his later novel, The Dharma Bums. The Project currently owns an editor's copy of this manuscript with Kerouac's hand written notes and it is retained at the Olin Library at Rollins College. In 2012, the house was listed in the National Register of Historic Places.

The Kerouac House is currently a writer's residence, hosting four writers throughout the year. Each writer lives in the house alone for three months, and works on their personal writing projects. They also participate in local literary readings.

Over time, the Project has counted on many generous benefactors to keep it going. According to an article in USA TODAY about the project, philanthropist Jeffrey Cole came to the rescue of the project to assist in buying the house. Darden Restaurants have continued to be a friend of the project as well.

In 2007, two of the board members were able to form Shady Lane Press. Though this is not formally tied to the Project, it has been successful in printing writings of several of the former writers. In October 2008, several students from Full Sail University produced a video about the house and its history. In September, 2013, a fundraiser was held for the organization at the Cornelia Street Cafe in New York City, which featured composer David Amram, author Joyce Johnson and actors Michael Shannon and John Ventimiglia.

== Notable visitors ==
- Steve Allen
- David Amram
- Douglas Brinkley
- Carolyn Cassady
- Billy Collins
- Lawrence Ferlinghetti
- Frank Messina
- Michael York (actor)
