= Gore, Virginia =

Unincorporated community in Virginia, United States

- Census-designated place
- Location within Virginia Location within the United States
- Coordinates: 39°15′50″N 78°19′55″W
- Country: United States
- State: Virginia
- County: Frederick

Area
  - Total: 0.88 sq mi (2.27 km^{2})

Population (2020)
  - Total: 249
  - Density: 284/sq mi (110/km^{2})
- Time zone: UTC−5 (Eastern (EST))
  - Summer (DST): UTC−4 (EDT)
- ZIP Codes: 22637
- GNIS feature ID: 1467267

Gore is an unincorporated community and census-designated place (CDP) in western Frederick County, Virginia, United States, located off the Northwestern Turnpike on Gore Road (SR 751), west of Winchester. The community is nestled in the Back Creek Valley. It has been called "Back Creek."

As of the 2020 census, Gore had a population of 249.

Gore serves as the western terminus of the Winchester and Western Railroad. It is home to the Gore plant of Unimin Corporation .

== Demographics ==
Gore first appeared as a census-designated place in the 2020 United States census.

== Historic sites (listed on National Register of Historic Places) ==
- Sunrise (1815)
- Willa Cather Birthplace (Rachel E. Boak House) (1850)
- Willow Shade (Willa Cather House) (1851)

== Notable person ==
Gore is the birthplace of the author Willa Cather.
