= Flannery O'Connor Childhood Home =

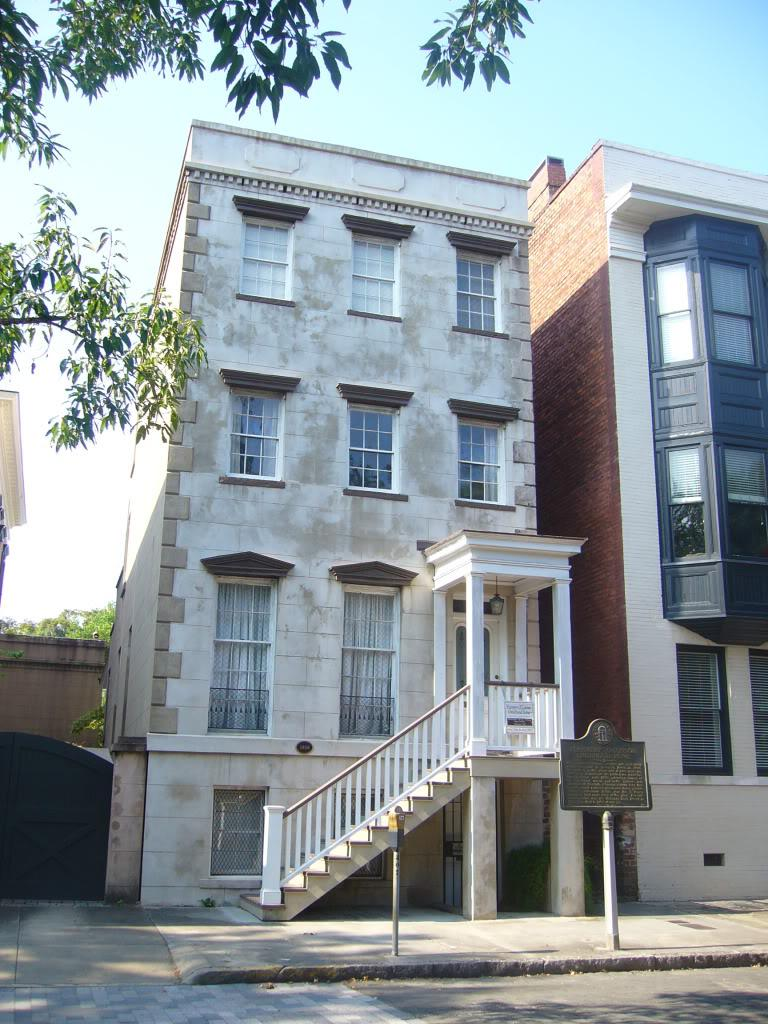
Flannery O'Connor lived here growing up

The Flannery O'Connor Childhood Home is a historic house museum in Savannah, Georgia where American author Flannery O'Connor lived during her childhood. The home, built in 1856, is located at 207 E. Charlton Street in Lafayette Square.

== History ==
Mary Flannery O'Connor lived in this home from her birth in 1925 until 1938. She later described herself in her childhood as a "pigeon-toed child with a receding chin and a you-leave-me-alone-or-I'll-bite-you complex". Her mother Regina was concerned about mosquitoes and occasionally put her daughter in a "Kiddie's Coop", a protective screened-in crib or box for infants and toddlers.

At six years old, she became somewhat of a local celebrity when the Pathé News reported on how "Little Mary O'Connor" had trained a chicken. As she recalled: "When I was six I had a chicken that walked backward and was in the Pathé News. I was in it too with the chicken. I was just there to assist the chicken but it was the high point in my life. Everything since has been an anticlimax."

While living here, O'Connor regularly attended mass at the nearby Cathedral of St. John the Baptist. It was close enough that she could see the spires from her house and hear the tolling of the bells.

== Museum ==
In 1989, the home was purchased by the Flannery O'Connor Childhood Home Foundation, led by Armstrong State University President Robert Burnett and professors Hugh Brown and Robert Strozier. After buying the house for $132,500, the Foundation sought period furniture and furnishings and requested that "anyone with photographs or memorabilia from Miss O'Connor's childhood in Savannah contact the foundation".

Today, in addition to serving as a museum, the house hosts several events and programs throughout the year. Their most well-known program is the annual Ursrey Memorial Lecture. The Ursrey Memorial Lecture, founded in 2009 by Alene Ursrey, John Hunt, and Betsy Cain, includes a reading and lecture and often educational workshops and gatherings. It is free and open to the public, and is endowed "in memory of the brothers Terry and Ashley Ursrey, native Georgians who, like Flannery O'Connor, were lifelong devotees of all things Southern, particularly the art of storytelling."

The home has a garden designed by Savannah landscape architect Clermont Huger Lee to be historically accurate and today it is named the Lee Garden. Lee and O'Connor have both been inducted into the Savannah Women of Vision.

== See also ==
- Andalusia, later home of O'Connor
- List of residences of American writers
