= Ross-Hand Mansion =

Historic house in New York, United States

- Ross Hand Mansion
- U.S. National Register of Historic Places
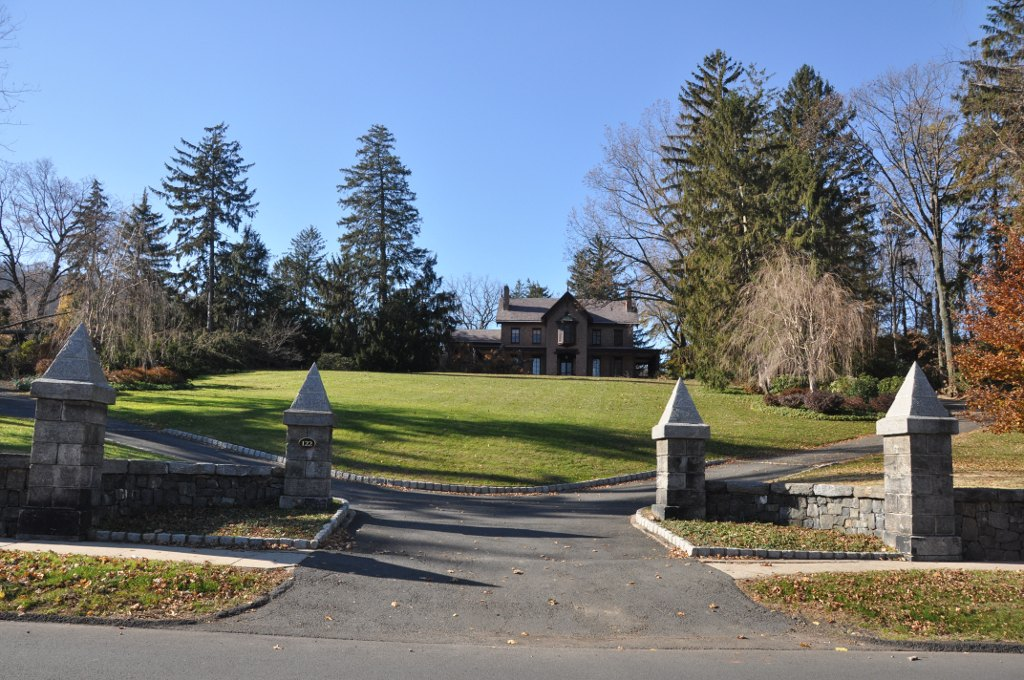

- Location within New York Location within the United States
- Location: 122 S. Franklin St., South Nyack, New York
- Coordinates: 41°5′12″N 73°55′23″W
- Area: 4.1 acres (1.7 ha)
- Built: 1859
- Architect: Downing, Andrew Jackson
- Architectural style: Late Gothic Revival
- NRHP reference No.: 83001787
- Added to NRHP: September 8, 1983

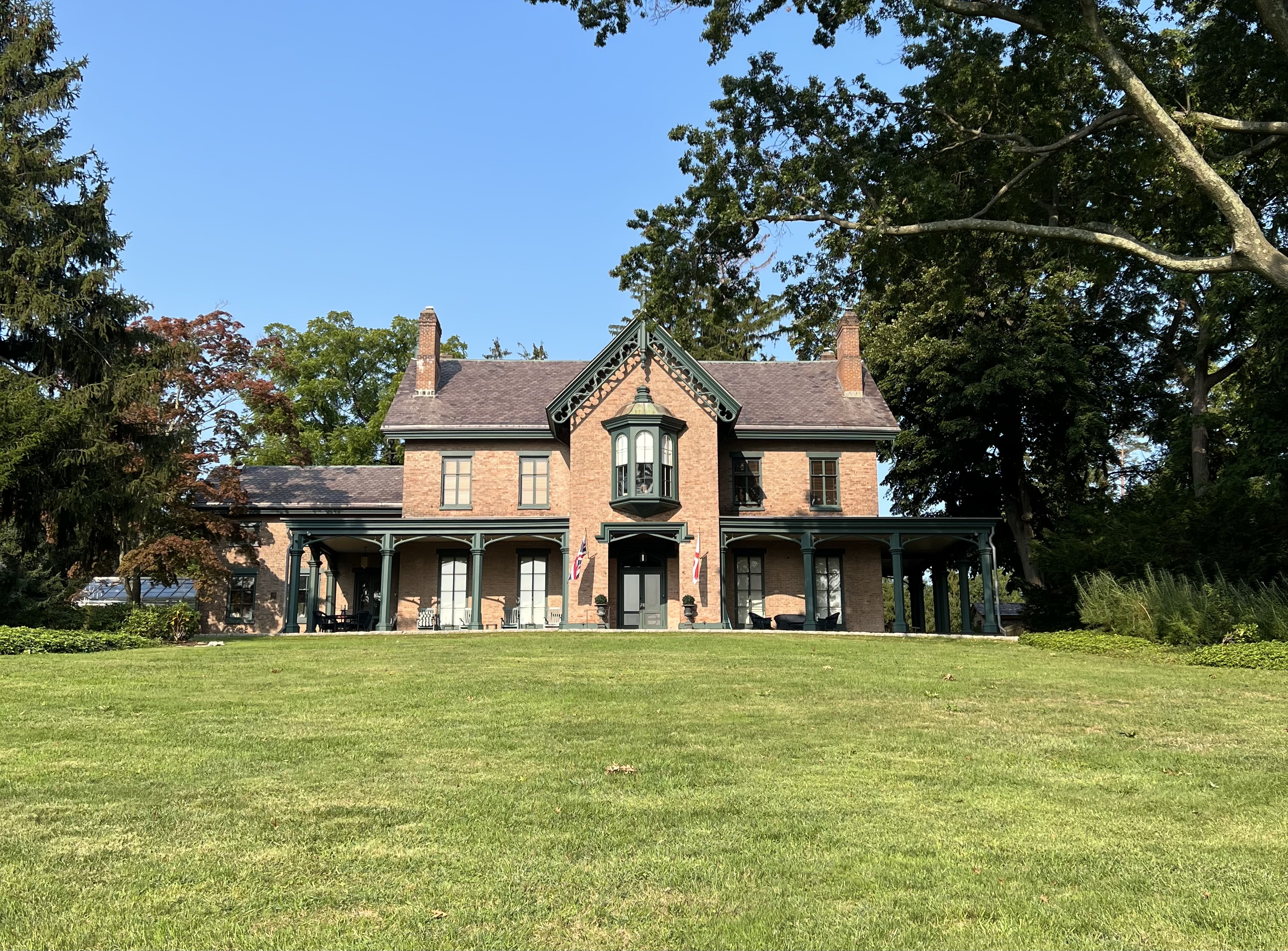
Ross Hand Mansion 2022, Eastern facade.

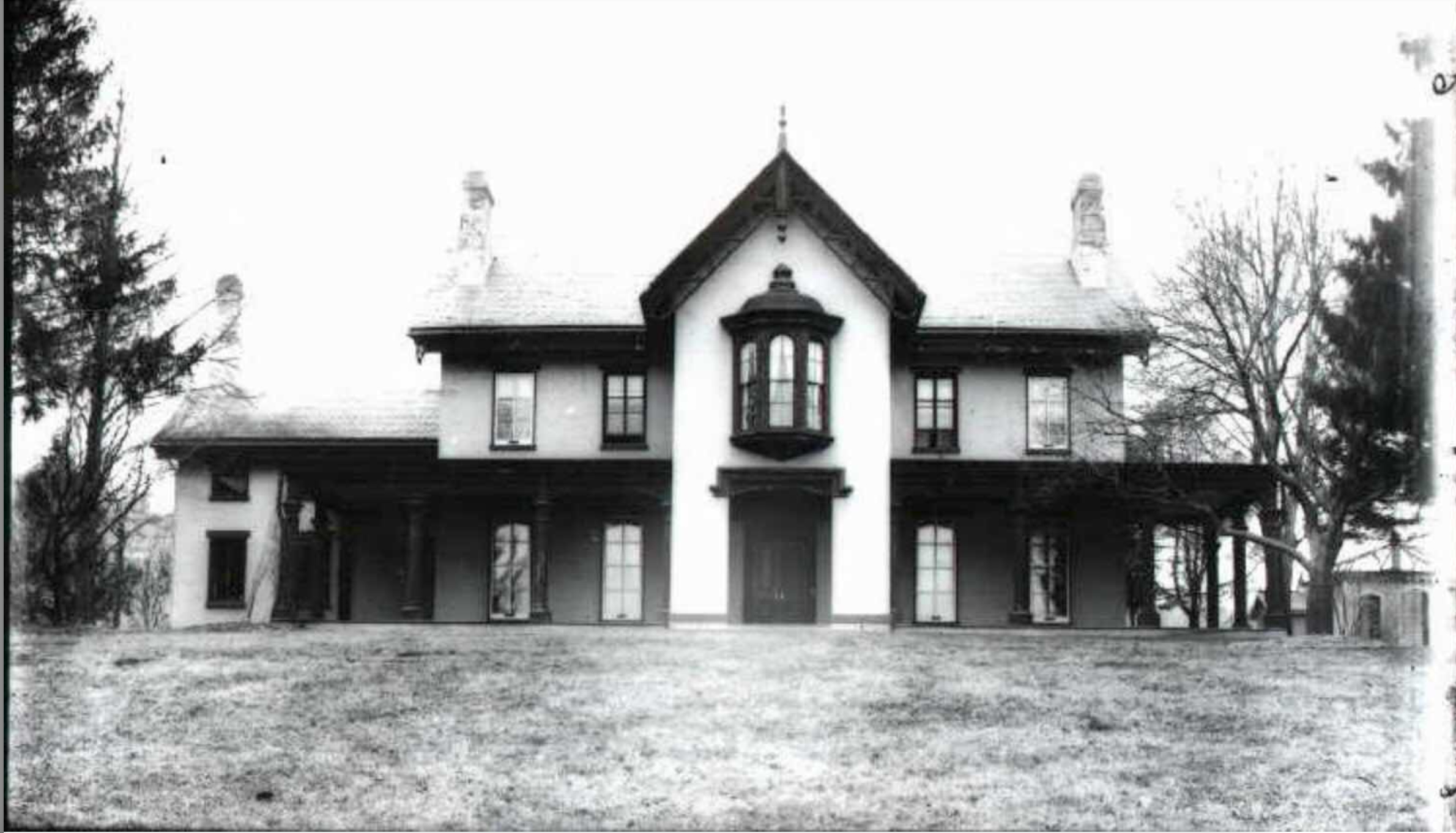
The Hand Mansion circa 1890 (source: New York Heritage Digital Collections)

The Ross–Hand Mansion is an historic home located at South Nyack in Rockland County, New York.

== History ==
=== Design and construction ===
The land was acquired from Garrett J Tallman (1784-1862) for $5,000 in 1856 by Azariah Ross (1787-1878). The Tallman family had occupied the land since 1675-76 when Harmen Douwenszen Taelman (1655–1691) came to camp on his father's land after an Indian deed had been signed and royal patent issued. Azariah Ross was a veteran of the War of 1812 and a successful New York City property developer. In 1826, Ross developed Dominick Street in Manhattan with brick-faced Federal-style houses, two-and-a-half stories tall; he moved his family into one of the first, the 20-foot-wide 45 Dominick Street, and used it as his Manhattan office. He sold his properties on Dominick Street by auction in December 1839. Ross had had a second home in Rockland County from about 1820.

Azariah Ross based his summer mansion in Nyack on the design for 'A Country House in the Pointed Style' from the Architecture of Country Houses: including designs for cottages, farm-houses, and villas, with remarks on interiors, furniture, and the best modes of warming and ventilating by the great landscape designer and architect Andrew Jackson Downing. The three-story brick mansion with Gothic Revival style features was completed by April 1859. It features ornamental bargeboards and a steeply pitched gable roof.

=== Azariah Ross ===
Azariah Ross was instrumental in extending the Northern Railroad to Nyack. On May 28, 1870, he hosted in the grounds of the Ross Hand Mansion a celebration of the arrival of the rail line. A banner was strung over the entrance reading 'Welcome to Nyack, the Gem of the Hudson' surrounded by fluttering flags. The chairman of the reception committee, Seth B Cole, gave a fulsome welcome to the crowds on the Mansion's lawn: “Nyack embosomed in the semi-circling hills that adorn the west bank of the noble Hudson at Tappan Zee - in possession of beauty and wealth of attractions rarely equaled, has cherished the unfolding hope ... when appreciative, intelligent, worthy and wealthy votaries shall seek and find a resting place in her bowers. Nyack in slumbering loveliness, has dreamed of this joyful hour”.

By 1871, trying to stave off financial uncertainty, Ross converted his house into a summer hotel, the Ross Mansion. Note that in the application packet to have the house considered for inclusion on the National Register of Historic Places, one source incorrectly attributes another name to the house during its years as a hotel. Azariah Ross died in March 1878 and was predeceased by his wife and seven of his eight children.

=== Hand Family ===
Announcement for the auction of the Ross Mansion published in the Evening Post, May 5, 1883

The Hand family on the veranda of the mansion, before 1898. The youngest son, Roger Haddock Hand, holds binoculars; his sister - Mary Hall Hand holds a mixing bowl. Mary, their mother, sits next to her husband, William Henry Hand, who holds a fan. In front of their older son, also William, is a pitcher. Two dogs are included in the scene. (source: New York Heritage Digital Collections)

On May 8, 1883 the home was purchased at a public auction hosted by Anthony J Bleeker in New York City by Mary Elizabeth Hand (née Haddock) (1836-1917) sister of Roger Haddock of Haddock's Hall in Piermont, NY. Mary's husband, William Henry Hand (1837-1898), was a prominent contractor whose projects included the libraries for Princeton and Columbia Universities, the Manhattan Beach Hotel on Coney Island and New York mansions for William Collins Whitney and Commodore Elbridge Thomas Gerry. Hand specialized in decorative woodwork and, with his sons William, Roger and Walter, completed extensive renovations on the property and installed elements, including a marble fireplace, from the Alexander Turney Stewart Mansion on Fifth Avenue in Manhattan that had recently been demolished. They converted the rear part of the property into a working farm with help from a lodger named Robert Latimer who had previously managed a family farm in West Nyack.

Hand's grandson, also named William Henry Hand (1900-1978), was an assistant to an elderly Thomas Edison. However, strong ethical differences over Edison's business practices led Hand to set out on his own and by 1930 he had established the Hand Laboratory for Electro-Chemical Research and Development in a barn on the grounds of his family's South Nyack mansion. There, over the next thirty years, Hand and his small team developed a long-life battery that was used by emergency services, the military, public works vehicles, school buses and in boats.

William Henry Hand lived at the house with his brother Raymond (1899-1972), sister Dorothy Crawford (1903-1995) and her daughter Adelma. When William died in 1978, Dorothy and Adelma and Adelma's children were the remaining occupants. In mid-1992 when Adelma was considering to list the property for sale, she paid for an analysis of soil samples. Dangerous levels of lead contamination were found in and around the outbuildings where the battery development had taken place: over the three decades of activity by her uncle and his team, it appears that battery acid, lead and other experimental material was dumped on the grounds of the mansion. In October 1992, Adelma reported the findings of lead contamination to the New York State Department of Environmental Conservation (NYS DEC). The property was deemed a risk to human health and placed as a Class 2 site on the NYS DEC Division of Hazardous Waste

Fireplace from the Stewart Mansion on Fifth Avenue, photograph circa 1950s

Remediation register of Inactive Hazardous Waste Sites, #344040. Adelma undertook a private remediation of the grounds at her own expense. In parallel, the NYS DEC performed soil testing of neighbouring properties, including the children's playground at the bottom of the hill, and implemented the full remediation of affected areas with state funds of those properties. The area was finally considered safe and removed from the NYS DEC register in 1998.

=== Outbuildings ===
Also on the property is a 19th-century barn and stable with a gymnasium (in the former battery laboratory) and a small brick smokehouse. The Mansion's original summer kitchen was located to the rear of the property and was demolished in about 1999.

=== Hudson River Designer Show House ===
In June 1997, the Mansion was the venue for the Hudson River Designer Show House with rooms reimagined by a number of designers including Louis Navarrete, Jean-Pierre Dovat and Mario Buatta.

=== Recent History ===
The property was sold in 1998, then again in 2014 and, most recently, in 2019.

The Ross-Hand Mansion was listed on the National Register of Historic Places in 1983.

== Other sources ==
- "NYS DEC clean up of surrounding properties". Newspapers.com.
