= Carson McCullers House =

Historic house in New York, United States

- U.S. National Register of Historic Places
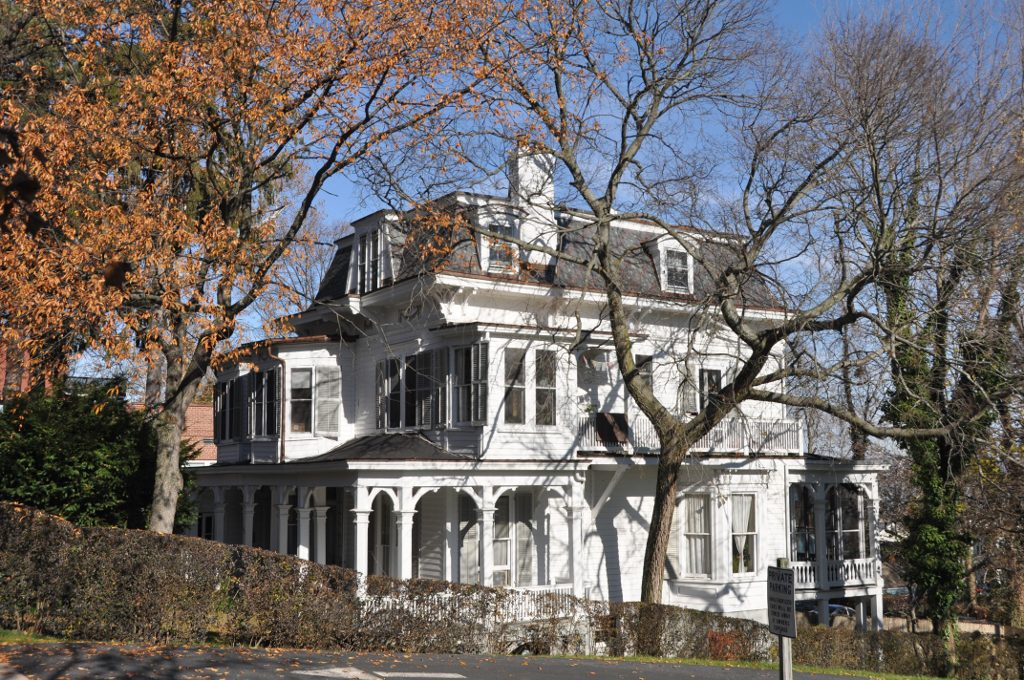

- Location within New York Location within the United States
- Location: 131 S. Broadway, South Nyack, New York
- Coordinates: 41°5′9″N 73°55′11″W
- Area: less than one acre
- Built: 1880
- Architectural style: Second Empire, Queen Anne, et al.
- NRHP reference No.: 06000562
- Added to NRHP: July 14, 2006

Carson McCullers House is a historic home located at South Nyack in Rockland County, New York. It is a two-story Second Empire–style residence constructed in 1880 and modified with subsequent interior and exterior modifications largely in the Colonial Revival spirit about 1910. It is a frame structure built originally as parsonage, three bays wide and four bays deep. It features a one-story verandah, a slate-covered mansard roof, and an interesting multi-story tower projection crowned by a bell-cast roof. It was home to noted author Carson McCullers (1917–1967) from 1945 to 1967.

It was listed on the National Register of Historic Places in 2006.

== See also ==
- List of residences of American writers
