= Sunrise (Gore, Virginia) =

Historic house in Virginia, United States

- U.S. National Register of Historic Places
- Virginia Landmarks Register
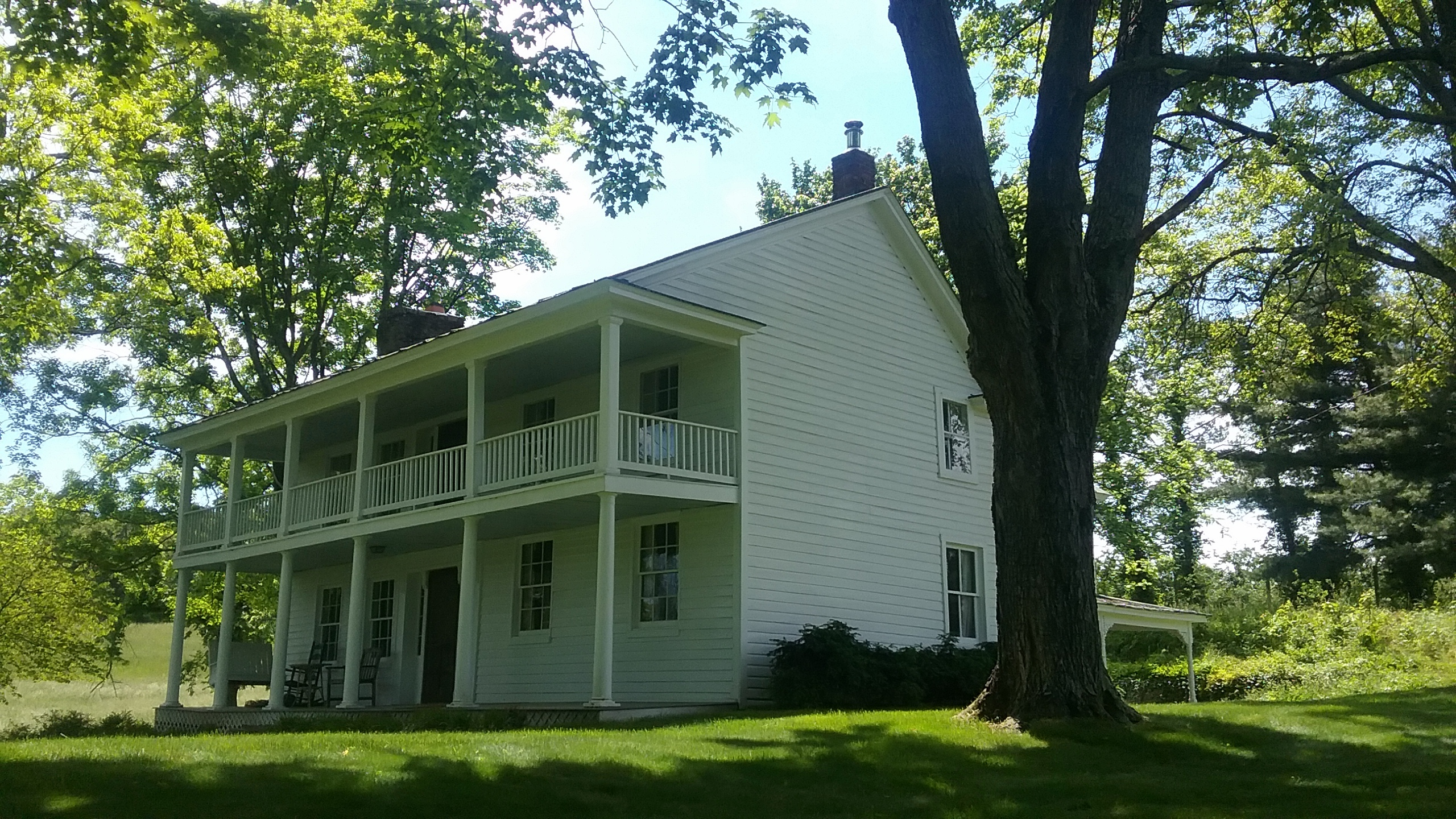

- Location within Virginia Location within the United States
- Location: 975 Hollow Rd., near Gore, Virginia
- Coordinates: 39°15′53.6″N 78°22′26.0″W
- Area: 26 acres (11 ha)
- Built: 1818, c. 1850, 1914
- Architectural style: Greek Revival
- NRHP reference No.: 95000021
- VLR No.: 034-0486

Significant dates
- Added to NRHP: February 8, 1995
- Designated VLR: October 19, 1994

Sunrise, also known as Muse House, is a historic home located near Gore, Frederick County, Virginia. It is a two-story, log and frame farmhouse in the Greek Revival style. The original section was built in 1818, with additions and modifications made around 1850, and around 1905. The main section measures approximately 18 feet by 39 feet and features a two-story, two-level, five bay, front porch and exterior fieldstone end chimney. Also on the property are the contributing meathouse and two barns. The house is bordered by fields, forest and apple, peach and cherry orchards.

It was listed on the National Register of Historic Places in 1995.

== See also ==
- National Register of Historic Places listings in Frederick County, Virginia
