= Arburtus Cottage =

- U.S. National Register of Historic Places
- New Jersey Register of Historic Places
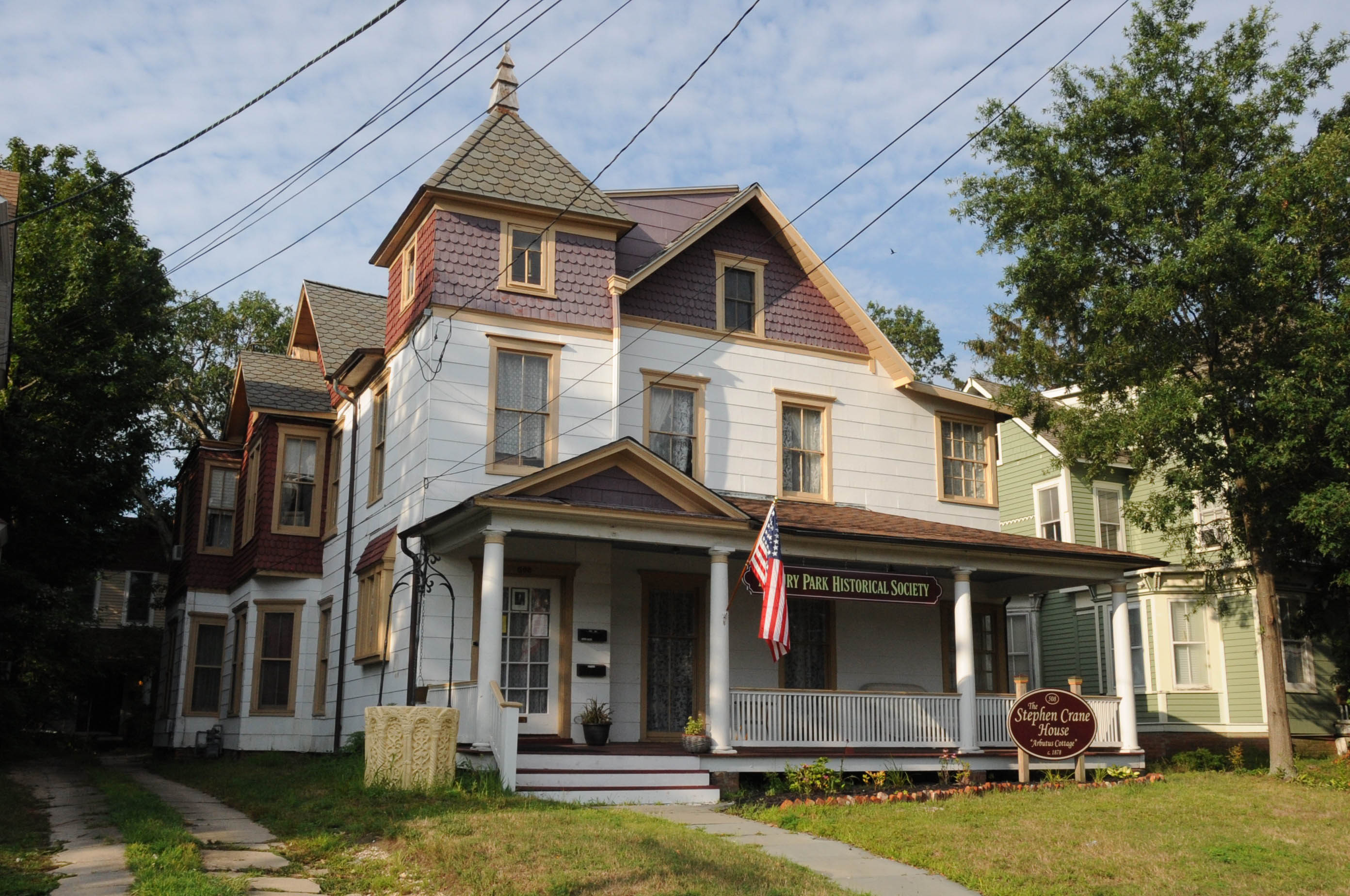

- Location within Monmouth County, New Jersey Location within New Jersey Location within the United States
- Location: 508 4th Avenue, Asbury Park, New Jersey
- Coordinates: 40°13′25.1″N 74°00′24.9″W
- Built: c. 1878
- Architectural style: Queen Anne
- NRHP reference No.: 15000003
- NJRHP No.: 5455

Significant dates
- Added to NRHP: August 18, 2015
- Designated NJRHP: December 16, 2014

The Arburtus Cottage, also known as the Stephen Crane House, is located at 508 4th Avenue in the city of Asbury Park in Monmouth County, New Jersey, United States. Built around 1878, the historic Queen Anne style seaside cottage was added to the National Register of Historic Places on August 18, 2015, for its significance in literature and social history. The author, poet, and journalist Stephen Crane lived here from 1883 to 1892. It is now the home of the Asbury Park Historical Society.

== History and description ==
The two and one-half story house was built around 1878 by Andrew and Helen Robeno. The house was later purchased by Mary Helen Peck Crane in 1883. Along with her son, Stephen, and daughter Agnes, she lived here year round. She enlarged the house around 1888. She was president of the local chapter of the Woman's Christian Temperance Union. Stephen wrote his first short story, "Uncle Jake and the Bell-Handle", in 1885.

== See also ==
- National Register of Historic Places listings in Monmouth County, New Jersey
- List of museums in New Jersey
- List of residences of American writers
