= Andalusia (Milledgeville, Georgia) =

Historic house in Georgia, United States

- U.S. National Register of Historic Places
- U.S. National Historic Landmark
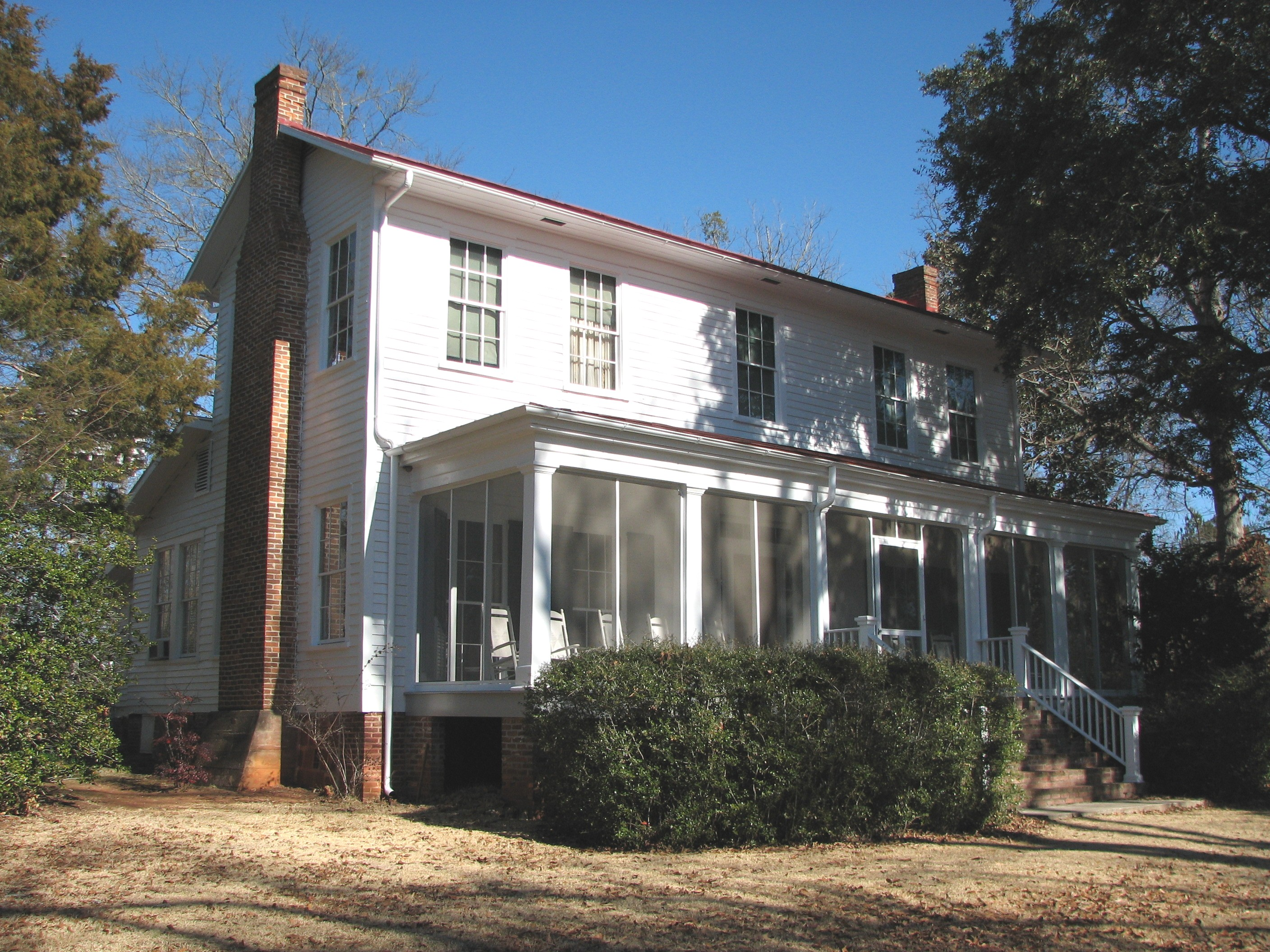

- Location within Georgia Location within the United States
- Nearest city: Milledgeville, Georgia
- Coordinates: 33.12526°N 83.26775°W
- Area: 544 acres (2.20 km^{2})
- Built: 1850s (Main House)
- Architectural style: Plantation Plain
- NRHP reference No.: 80000968
- Added to NRHP: 1980

Andalusia is a historic home once owned by Southern American author Flannery O'Connor. The estate is located in rural Georgia in Baldwin County, Georgia, approximately 4 miles (6.4 km) northwest of Milledgeville. It comprises 544 acres (2.20 km^{2}), including the plantation house where O'Connor wrote some of her last and best-known fiction.

== History ==
The land on which Andalusia was first built had in the mid-19th century been a working plantation of between 1,500 and 1,700 acres owned and operated by Joseph and Mary "Polly" Stovall. The plantation was worked by no less than 39 enslaved people owned by Stovall. After Polly Stovall's death, the estate was purchased at a public auction by sometime mayor of Milledgeville, Nathan Hawkins, and later sold to Col. Thomas Johnson of Kentucky in 1870. Hawkins had 100 enslaved people working the property, many of whom were sold at the auction block next to the Presbyterian Church in Milledgeville.

In 1951, Flannery O'Connor returned to her home state of Georgia, where she had grown up, after being diagnosed with a form of lupus. She first lived in the family home of her mother, Regina, on Greene Street in Milledgeville, then owned by her uncles Louis and Bernard Cline. There, she finished her manuscript for her novel Wise Blood and, with her health improving, she moved with her mother to Andalusia, then still a working farm. She had visited the home every summer in her childhood. Her mother had jointly inherited the 544-acre property along with her brother Louis Cline from their uncle.

O'Connor saw her time at Andalusia as a temporary place to restore her health, not as a permanent home, though her health still fluctuated. As she wrote to editor Robert Giroux, "I am up and around again now but won't be well enough to go back to Connecticut for some time." She hosted several visitors, including Jesuit priest Fr. James McCown, who became a close friend and spiritual mentor, and writer Katherine Anne Porter.

Even so, she sometimes felt isolated from the active literary culture which she hoped to join and lamented the boredom of her life at the farm: "This season we have had three peachickens hatch and have killed one rattlesnake. Otherwise nothing goes on around here." Nevertheless, she found her experience there was an influence on her writing. The bulk of her life's work was written there and several of her short stories are set in the area, including "The Displaced Person", which scholars identify as the one which closest resembles the farm. She died in the hospital in nearby Milledgeville in August, 1964.

== Modern history ==
It is believed that novelist John Kennedy Toole attempted to visit the house shortly before his suicide in 1969, though the home was not then open to the public.

The home was listed on the National Register of Historic Places in 1980 and opened as a museum in 2003. The estate is currently maintained by The Andalusia Foundation, Inc.

In August 2017, the Georgia College and State University accepted the donation of Andalusia. Matthew Davis, director of the historic Old Governor's Mansion, said the university plans to restore and preserve the farm.

Andalusia Farm was designated a National Historic Landmark on February 24, 2022.

== See also ==
- List of residences of American writers
- Flannery O'Connor Childhood Home
