= The Scott and Zelda Fitzgerald Museum =

Historic house and museum in Montgomeryh, Alabama

Coordinates: 32.35883°N 86.29227°W

Scott and Zelda Fitzerald Museum

The Scott and Zelda Fitzgerald Museum is a historic house museum in Montgomery, Alabama where writers F. Scott Fitzgerald and his wife Zelda Fitzgerald lived from 1931 to 1932. The large Craftsman-style house was the last home where the Fitzgerald family lived together. During their stay, Scott worked on his novel, Tender is the Night (1934) and Zelda began writing Save Me the Waltz (1932). After the Fitzgeralds relocated to Baltimore, Maryland in 1932, the house was turned into apartments. The McPhillips family of Montgomery saved the home from being destroyed in 1986 by purchasing the property and establishing the Scott and Zelda Fitzgerald Museum.

== Description ==
The Scott and Zelda Fitzgerald Museum at 919 Felder Ave, is located in the Cloverdale Historic District in Montgomery, Alabama. The large, two-story house was built in 1904. After the Fitzgeralds moved out, the house was converted into four apartments. In 1986, when the house was scheduled to be torn down, Leslie and Julian McPhillips bought the home and donated it as the Scott and Zelda Fitzgerald Museum.

The museum displays Fitzgerald memorabilia, including letters, personal possessions, photographs, first-edition Scott and Zelda Fitzgerald novels, and several of Zelda's paintings. Two upstairs apartments, the "Zelda Suite" and the "Scott Suite", are available to rent through Airbnb. The Fitzgerald Prize for Literary Excellence is awarded annually by the museum "to an author whose work continues the legacy of American storytelling while also exemplifying the craft, wit, and social insight typified by F. Scott Fitzgerald".

== History ==
Scott Fitzgerald first arrived in Montgomery, Alabama, in June 1918, when he was assigned to Camp Sheridan during World War I. He met his future wife, Zelda Sayre, at a country club dance in Montgomery the following month. Zelda, a local debutante, grew up in Montgomery's Cottage Hill Historic District. Scott and Zelda married in April, 1920 in New York City, one week after the debut of his first novel, This Side of Paradise. Their daughter Scottie was born in 1921 in St. Paul, Minnesota. The family lived in several U.S. cities before moving to France in 1924. While in France, Fitzgerald completed The Great Gatsby and wrote several short stories. Zelda suffered a mental breakdown in 1930, was diagnosed as a schizophrenic and spent the next eighteen months in two European psychiatric clinics.

In September 1931, the family returned to Montgomery with the plan of making the southern city their permanent home. Zelda wanted to live near her parents because her father was ill and the couple hoped that a quieter life in Montgomery would be beneficial to Zelda's continuing recovery. This would the last home where the Fitzgerald family lived together. For several months, Scott worked on his novel, Tender is the Night. He also spent five weeks in Hollywood rewriting a screenplay. While in Montgomery, Zelda wrote short stories and outlined her only novel, Save Me the Walz. Zelda's father's health worsened and he died on November 17, 1931.

In February 1932, Zelda suffered another mental breakdown and asked to be hospitalized again. She was admitted to the Henry Phipps Psychiatric Clinic at the Johns Hopkins Hospital in Baltimore, Maryland. Scott spent the winter with Scottie in Montgomery, reading Great Expectations to her, teaching her chess and entertaining her school class with a treasure hunt. In the early spring of 1932, Scott and his daughter left Montgomery and moved to Baltimore to be closer to Zelda. Scott rented a 15-room Victorian house called "La Paix" at Rodgers Forge, Towson, just outside Baltimore.

== See also ==
- F. Scott Fitzgerald House, Minnesota
- List of residences of American writers
