= South Nyack, New York =

- Hamlet
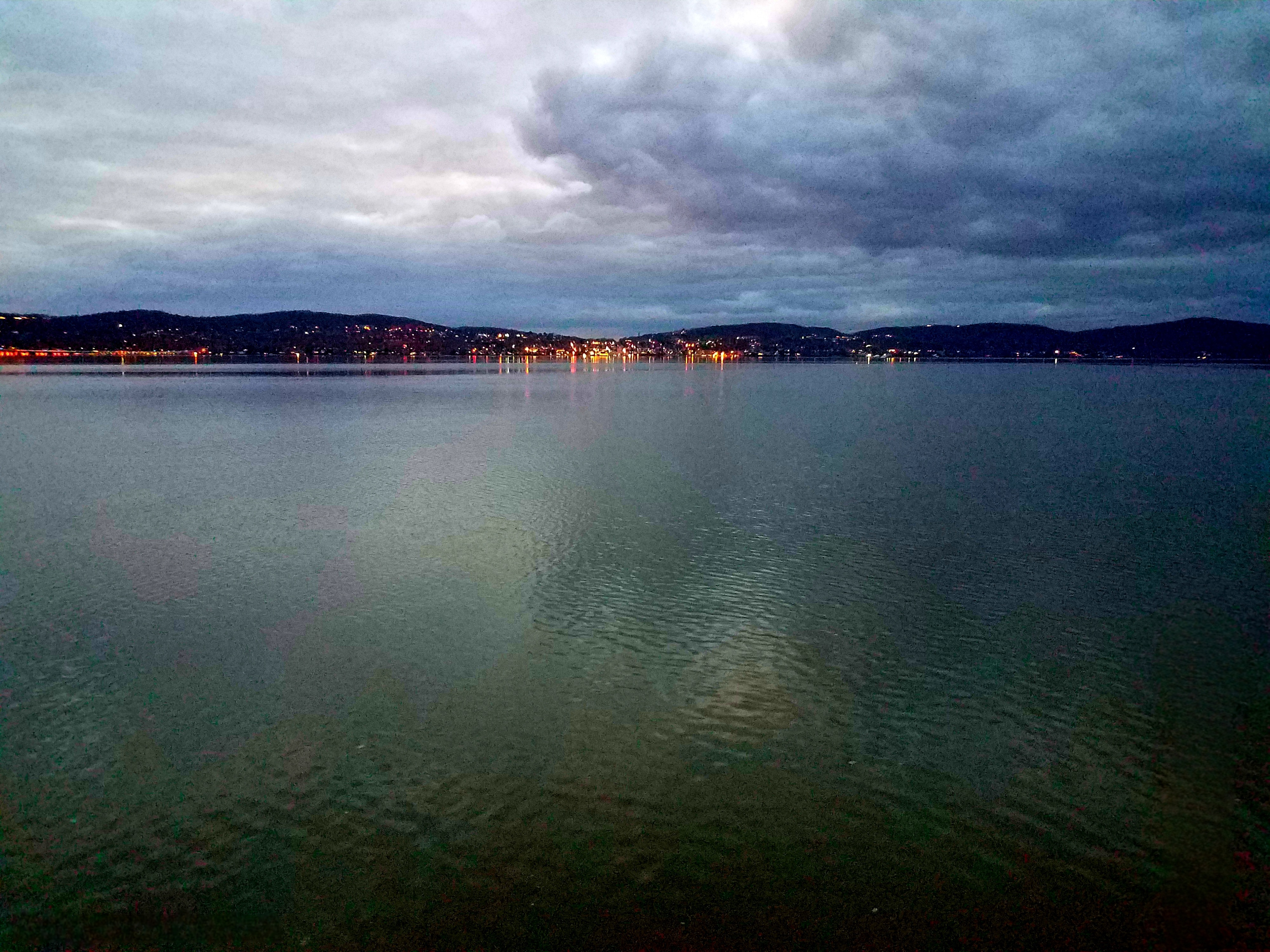
- Evening view of South Nyack from across the Hudson River

- Location in Rockland County and the state of New York.

- Location within the state of New York
- Coordinates: 41°5′2″N 73°55′23″W
- Country: United States
- State: New York
- County: Rockland
- Town: Orangetown
- Incorporated: 1878
- Dissolved: 2022

Area
  - Total: 1.68 sq mi (4.35 km^{2})
  - Land: 0.60 sq mi (1.56 km^{2})
  - Water: 1.08 sq mi (2.79 km^{2})
- Elevation: 72 ft (22 m)

Population (2020)
  - Total: 2,699
  - Density: 4,479.7/sq mi (1,729.64/km^{2})
- Time zone: UTC-5 (Eastern (EST))
  - Summer (DST): UTC-4 (EDT)
- ZIP code: 10960
- Area code: 845
- FIPS code: 36-69441
- GNIS feature ID: 0965828
- Website: southnyack.ny.gov

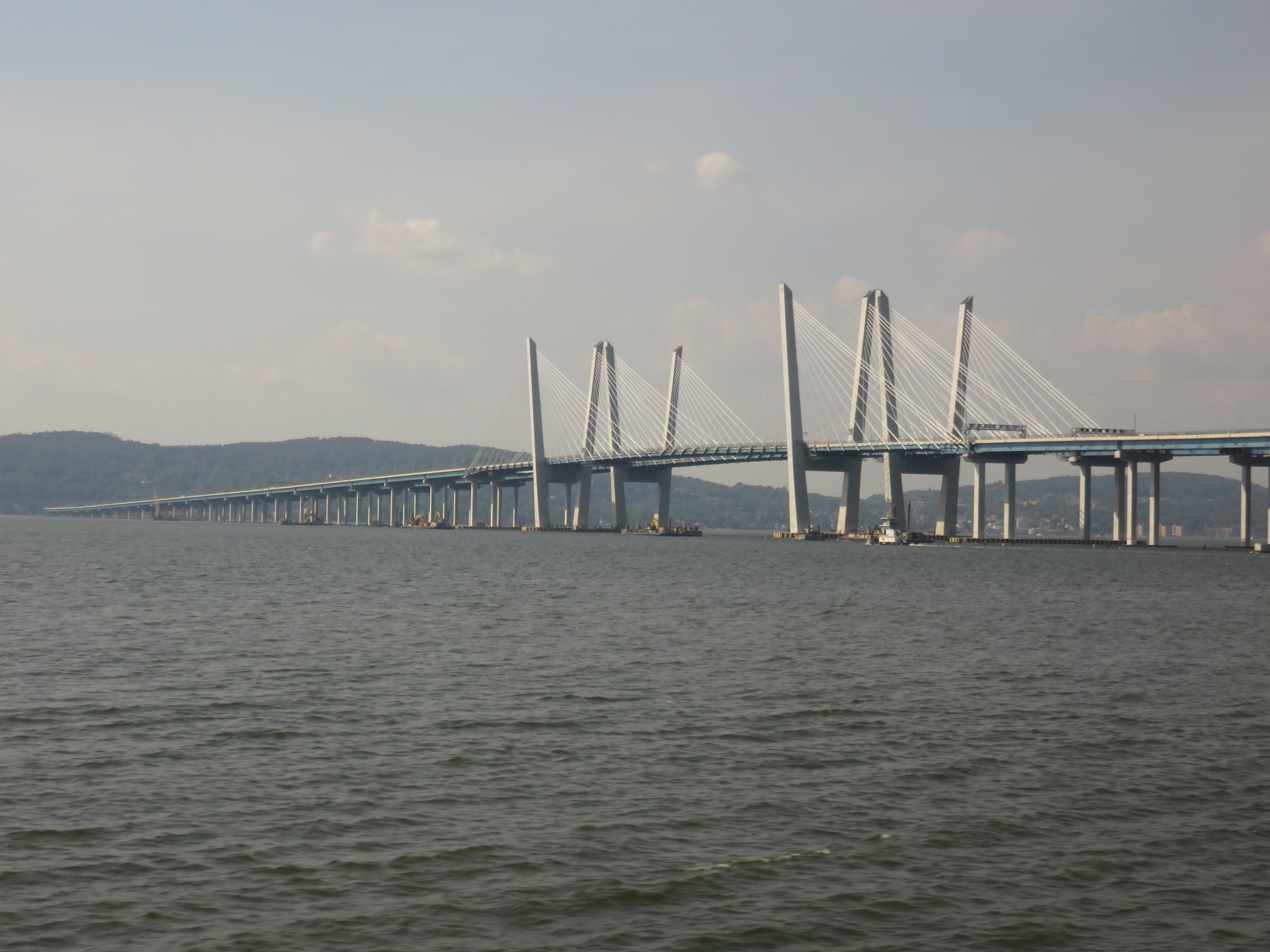
The Tappan Zee Bridge connects South Nyack in Rockland County and Tarrytown in Westchester County across the Hudson River in New York State. The original 1955 bridge was replaced in 2017.

South Nyack (English pronunciation: /ˈnaɪæk/) is a hamlet and census-designated place in the town of Orangetown in Rockland County, New York, United States. It is located north of Grand View-on-Hudson, northeast of Orangeburg, east of Blauvelt State Park, south of Nyack and west of the Hudson River. The hamlet is the western terminus of the Tappan Zee Bridge. As of the 2020 census, South Nyack had a population of 2,699. The hamlet was formerly incorporated as a village from 1878 until 2022.

== History ==
Following the extension of the Northern Branch of The New Jersey Railroad into the area in the mid-19th century, rapid growth ensued. Town government no longer being seen as an effective means of dealing with the area's needs, village incorporation was discussed. Fearing higher taxes, those in what would have become the northern part of Nyack village formed their own municipal corporation first, named Upper Nyack. The area of Nyack village was still incorporated, although without this northern portion. Residents in the southern part of Nyack village, however, soon became dissatisfied with the notion of paying taxes that more heavily benefitted the rest of the village. After succeeding in dissolving Nyack's corporation, the southern portion of the former village voted on 25 May 1878 to incorporate as the Village of South Nyack with the newly-constituted Board of Trustees holding their first meeting on Monday 29 July 1878. The area between the Village of Upper Nyack and the Village of South Nyack was reincorporated thereafter, again as the Village of Nyack.

On December 17, 2020 residents voted 508-292 to dissolve the village in favor of becoming an unincorporated area within the town of Orangetown. The dissolution vote did not take immediate effect, and the village continued to exist until March 31, 2022, after which it became a hamlet within the Town of Orangetown.

== Geography ==
According to the United States Census Bureau, the hamlet has a total area of 1.7 square miles (4.4 km^{2}), of which 0.6 square miles (1.6 km^{2}) is land and 1.1 square miles (2.8 km^{2}), or 63.31%, is water. South Nyack is located adjacent to the Hudson River.

The New York State Thruway (Interstate 287) bisects the hamlet of South Nyack on the western end of the Tappan Zee Bridge.

== Demographics ==
Historical population
| Census | Pop. | Note | %± |
|---|---|---|---|
| 1890 | 1,496 | | — |
| 1900 | 1,601 | | 7.0% |
| 1910 | 2,068 | | 29.2% |
| 1920 | 1,799 | | −13.0% |
| 1930 | 2,212 | | 23.0% |
| 1940 | 2,093 | | −5.4% |
| 1950 | 3,102 | | 48.2% |
| 1960 | 3,113 | | 0.4% |
| 1970 | 3,435 | | 10.3% |
| 1980 | 3,602 | | 4.9% |
| 1990 | 3,352 | | −6.9% |
| 2000 | 3,473 | | 3.6% |
| 2010 | 3,510 | | 1.1% |
| 2020 | 2,699 | | −23.1% |
U.S. Decennial Census

As of the census of 2000, there were 3,473 people, 1,201 households, and 690 families residing in the village. The population density was 5,665.0 inhabitants per square mile (2,187.3/km^{2}). There were 1,258 housing units at an average density of 2,052.0 per square mile (792.3/km^{2}). The racial makeup of the village was 71.32% White, 16.04% African American, 0.20% Native American, 5.79% Asian, 0.03% Pacific Islander, 2.39% from other races, and 4.23% from two or more races. Hispanic or Latino of any race were 6.91% of the population.

There were 1,201 households, out of which 26.9% had children under the age of 18 living with them, 45.1% were married couples living together, 9.2% had a female householder with no husband present, and 42.5% were non-families. 31.3% of all households were made up of individuals, and 8.4% had someone living alone who was 65 years of age or older. The average household size was 2.43 and the average family size was 3.10.

In the village, the population was spread out, with 18.3% under the age of 18, 20.5% from 18 to 24, 29.7% from 25 to 44, 20.8% from 45 to 64, and 10.8% who were 65 years of age or older. The median age was 32 years. For every 100 females, there were 94.8 males. For every 100 females age 18 and over, there were 89.3 males.

The median income for a household in the village was $53,000, and the median income for a family was $62,262. Males had a median income of $45,735 versus $39,850 for females. The per capita income for the village was $26,135. About 6.2% of families and 8.9% of the population were below the poverty line, including 8.4% of those under age 18 and 10.8% of those age 65 or over.

== Tourism ==
=== Historical markers ===
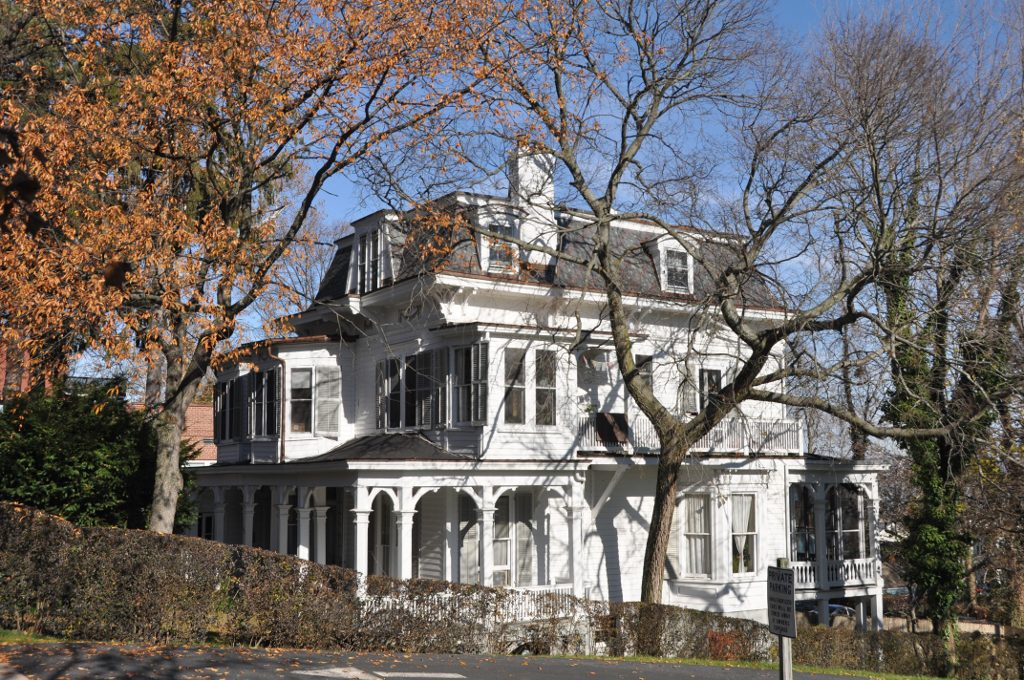
Carson McCullers House

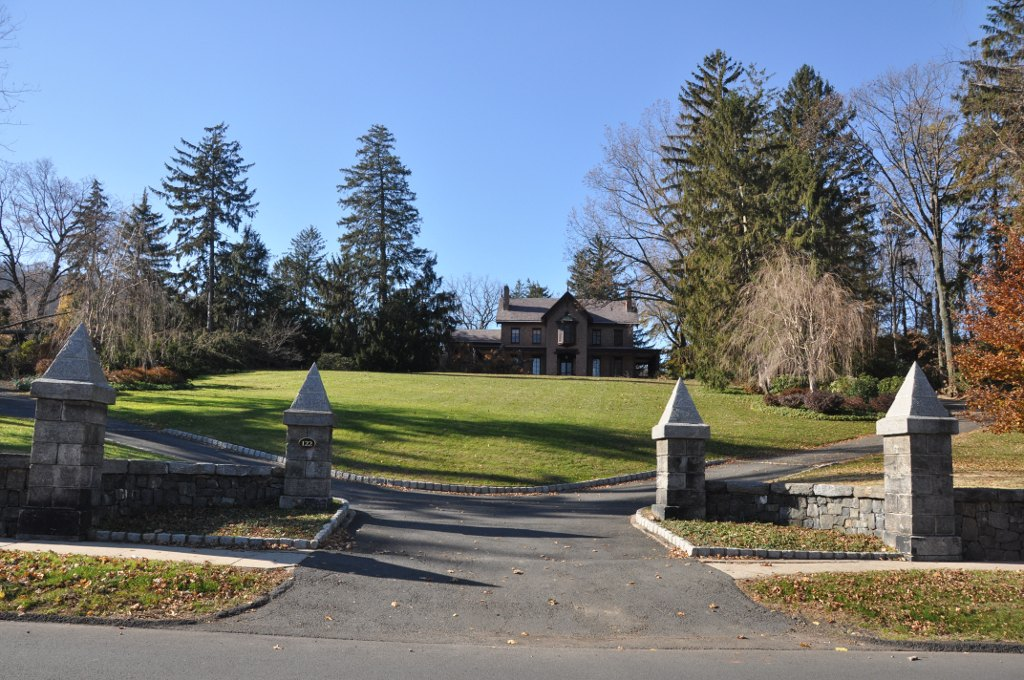
Ross-Hand Mansion

- Carson McCullers House – 131 South Broadway – (NRHP)
- Ross-Hand Mansion – 122 South Franklin Street - (NRHP)
- Joseph Cornell House - 137 South Broadway

=== Landmarks and places of interest ===
- Nyack College – Established 1897 by Dr. A.B. Simpson as the "Missionary Training Institute". It is considered to be the first school of its kind in North America. Simpson Hall, built 1897, is believed to be one of the oldest wooden institutional structures and largest the Victorian structure in the Hudson Valley.
- St. Paul’s United Methodist Church – 134 South Broadway at Division Avenue

=== Other sites of interest ===
The Nyack Ice House, formerly located at 90 Clinton Avenue, which opened in 1881, producing and delivering blocks of ice to homes, restaurants, bars and stores, was demolished on April 2 and 3, 2008. During the 19th century, the Nyack Ice House was the only ice plant between Englewood, New Jersey and Newburgh, New York. When sold in 1921, production of coal and later oil began at the site and the name changed to "Nyack Ice and Coal Co." In 1965, the business also sold milk and was operated under the original name. Recently, the company sold mostly to ice carvers and supermarkets and supplied the ice for magician David Blaine's stunt in 2000 when he suspended himself in a block of ice over Times Square.

Orangetown Fire Company No. 1, located at 90 Depot Place, was founded in 1834 and was Rockland County's first fire company. Today it is one of eight components of the Nyack Fire Department. The company was unofficially formed in 1832 with 16 members and was organized in 1834. The company still holds in its possession its first apparatus, which dates back to 1749 and survived a fire in the firehouse some years ago. The Orangetown Fire Company No. 1 also serves Upper Nyack and Nyack.

== Transportation ==
South Nyack is the western terminus of the Tappan Zee Bridge, which connects the Rockland County to Tarrytown in Westchester County. South Nyack is served by the New York State Thruway (in its section concurrent with Interstate 87 and Interstate 287) at Exit 10. Another important arterial roadway accessible in South Nyack is U.S. Route 9W.

Before and during its incorporation as a Village, South Nyack was served by the Northern Branch of the Erie Railroad, with service to Pavonia Terminal in Jersey City. South Nyack train station was located Between Mansfield and Cornelison Avenues, along Chase Avenue, a road that was obliterated when the massive I-287 interchange was built in the 1950s. Passenger service was discontinued in 1965, and the right-of-way has been converted into the Raymond G. Esposito Trail.

Today, South Nyack is served by Lower Hudson Transit Link buses which are run the NY State Department of Transportation, with South Nyack's bus stop located on Franklin Street Extension. H07 buses connect South Nyack to Tarrytown while H05 buses connect to White Plains. South Nyack is also served by Rockland Coaches/Red and Tan Lines Buses (operated by Coach USA) to the Port Authority Bus Terminal and George Washington Bridge Bus Terminal in New York City.

== Notable people ==
- Carson McCullers, novelist, playwright, and poet.
- Joseph Cornell (1903-1972), American visual artist and filmmaker
- Rosie O'Donnell, comedian and LGBT activist.
- Arthur Zegart (1916-1989), American documentary film producer.
