= Willa Cather Birthplace =

Historic house in Virginia, United States

- U.S. National Register of Historic Places
- Virginia Landmarks Register
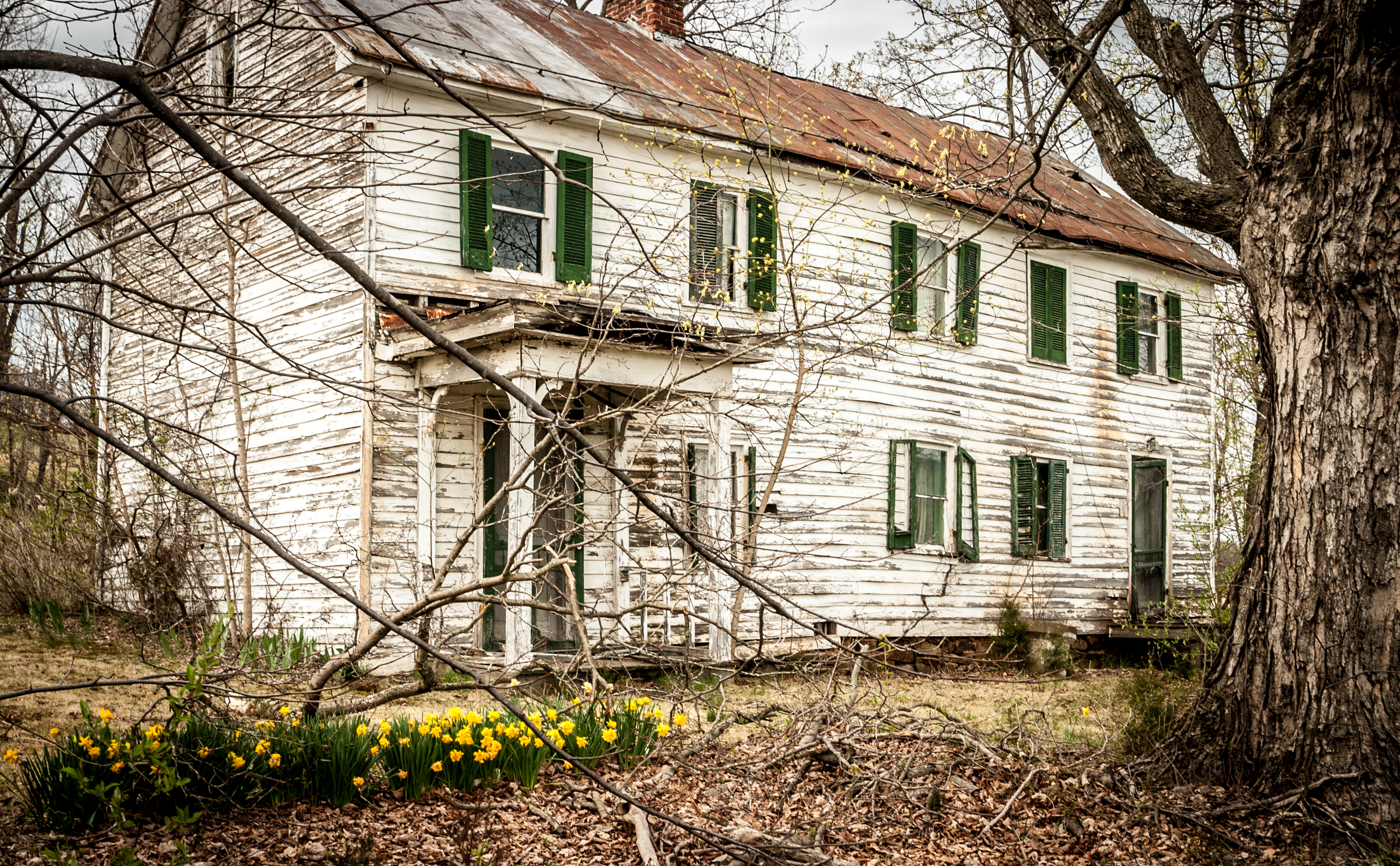
- Willa Cather Birthplace, April 2013

- Location within Virginia Location within the United States
- Location: On U.S. 50 NW of Gore, Virginia, U.S.
- Coordinates: 39°16′3″N 78°19′27″W
- Built: 1850
- NRHP reference No.: 78003017
- VLR No.: 034-0161

Significant dates
- Added to NRHP: November 16, 1978
- Designated VLR: September 21, 1976

The Willa Cather Birthplace, also known as the Rachel E. Boak House, is the site near Gore, Virginia, where the Pulitzer Prize-winning author Willa Cather was born in 1873. The log home was built in the early 19th century by her great-grandfather and has been enlarged twice. The building was previously the home of Rachel E. Boak, Cather's grandmother. Cather and her parents lived in the house only about a year before they moved to another home in Frederick County. The farmhouse was listed on the Virginia Landmarks Register (VLR) in 1976 and the National Register of Historic Places (NRHP) in 1978.

== History ==
The house was originally owned by Cather's great-grandfather, Jacob Seibert. The original portion of the home was probably built in the 1810s. A two-story frame extension on the western end of the house was added around twenty years later while an ell was probably added sometime after the Civil War. In 1869, the home and 4.5 acres (1.8 ha) of land was conveyed to Seibert's daughter, Rachel E. Boak. Virginia Boak, her daughter, and Charles Cather were married at the house in December 1872. The following year on December 7, the couple's first child, Willa Cather, was born in the house. In 1874, Willa and her parents moved to a nearby home, Willow Shade, also listed on the NRHP. Cather's relatives began moving to Nebraska in the 1870s and her family followed in 1883, settling in Red Cloud. The house where she was born was conveyed from Cather's grandmother to a woman named S.S. Gore. Ownership of the home changed hands four more times until being purchased by Charles T. Brill in 1950. At the time of the home's historical survey taken in 1976, Brill used the building as an office and retreat.

The Willa Cather Birthplace was added to the VLR on September 21, 1976, and the NRHP on November 16, 1978. A historical marker in front of the home was installed by the Virginia Department of Historic Resources. The marker reads:

Here Willa Sibert Cather, the novelist, was born December 7, 1873. This community was her home until 1883 when her family moved to Nebraska. Nearby on Back Creek stands the old mill described in her novel Sapphira and the Slave Girl.

In 2023 the dilapidated building was listed for sale. Members of the Cather family and the National Willa Cather Center began fundraising to purchase the property. In May 2023 the house and surrounding 5 acres (2.02 ha) were purchased for $180,000 by a local realtor and historic preservationist. The property will be donated to a local nonprofit which plans to renovate and restore the house.

== Architecture ==
The vernacular building is a simple two-story log house. The rear portion of the home features a two-story frame ell extending from the center. The facade has three windows on the first floor and five windows on the second. All of the facade windows feature louvered blinds. Doors are located on the western and eastern ends of the home's facade with a simple porch attached to the western entrance. The original portion of the home includes the three bays on the eastern end. A chimney was attached to the western end of the original portion before the later extension. The chimney was incorporated into the building and the smokestack is now only visible above the roof ridge. The gable roof is covered with standing seam sheet metal with box cornices at the eaves. Most of the exterior walls are covered with weatherboards with the remaining sections covered with asbestos shingles. The underpinning of the home is made of fieldstone.

Each floor of the home's main section contains two large rooms while the rear ell has one large room on each floor. The ell's first floor room contains the kitchen. Many of the original details are still intact in the main section of the house such as the flooring, stairwell, and batten doors. The staircase features square balusters and a square newel. A dilapidated two-story kitchen and servants' house, possibly built in the 1930s or 1940s, is located behind the home.

== See also ==
- National Register of Historic Places listings in Frederick County, Virginia
