= Willow Shade =

Historic house in Virginia, United States

- U.S. National Register of Historic Places
- Virginia Landmarks Register
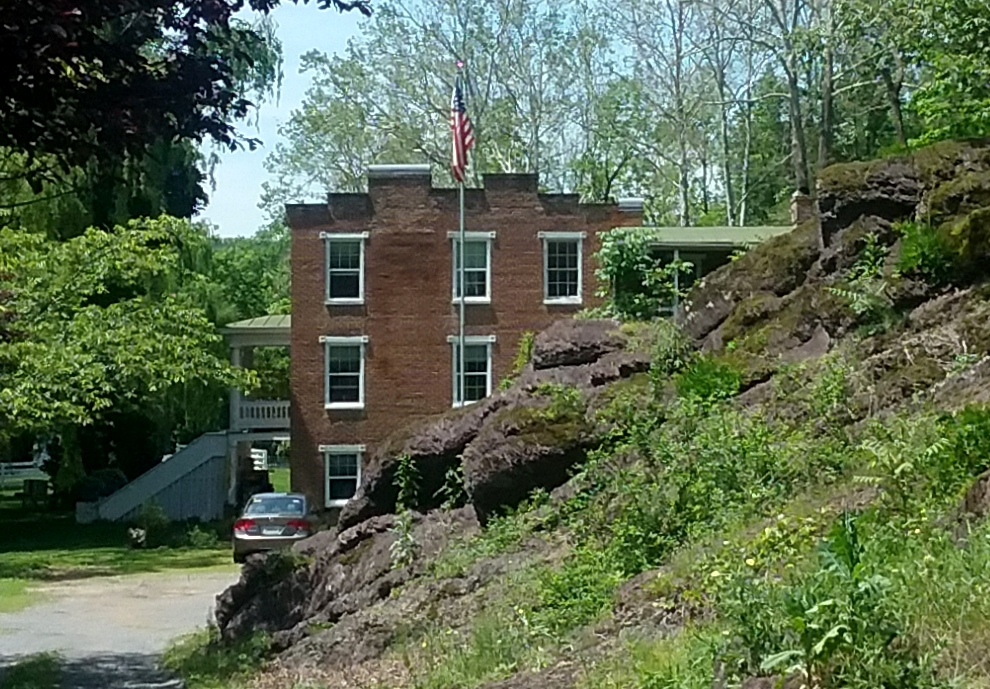

- Location within Virginia Location within the United States
- Location: Jct. of Frederick Co. Rd. and US 50, near Winchester, Virginia
- Coordinates: 39°16′06.7″N 78°18′28.7″W
- Area: 4.5 acres (1.8 ha)
- Built: 1851
- Architectural style: Greek Revival, Vernacular Greek Revival
- NRHP reference No.: 90001925
- VLR No.: 034-0162

Significant dates
- Added to NRHP: December 18, 1990
- Designated VLR: December 12, 1989

Willow Shade, also known as the Willa Cather House, is a historic home located near Winchester, Frederick County, Virginia. The house was built in 1851, and is a two-story, five-bay-by-three-bay, rectangular brick dwelling in a vernacular Late Greek Revival style. It has a three bay by two bay rear ell. The house sits on an English basement. It was the childhood home of author Willa Cather (1873–1947) and was built by her grandfather, William Cather. She was born at the nearby Willa Cather Birthplace and resided at Willow Shade from 1874 to 1883 before moving to Nebraska.

It was listed on the National Register of Historic Places in 1990.

== See also ==
- National Register of Historic Places listings in Frederick County, Virginia
- List of residences of American writers
