= Kate Chopin House (St. Louis, Missouri) =

Historic house in Missouri, United States

- U.S. National Register of Historic Places
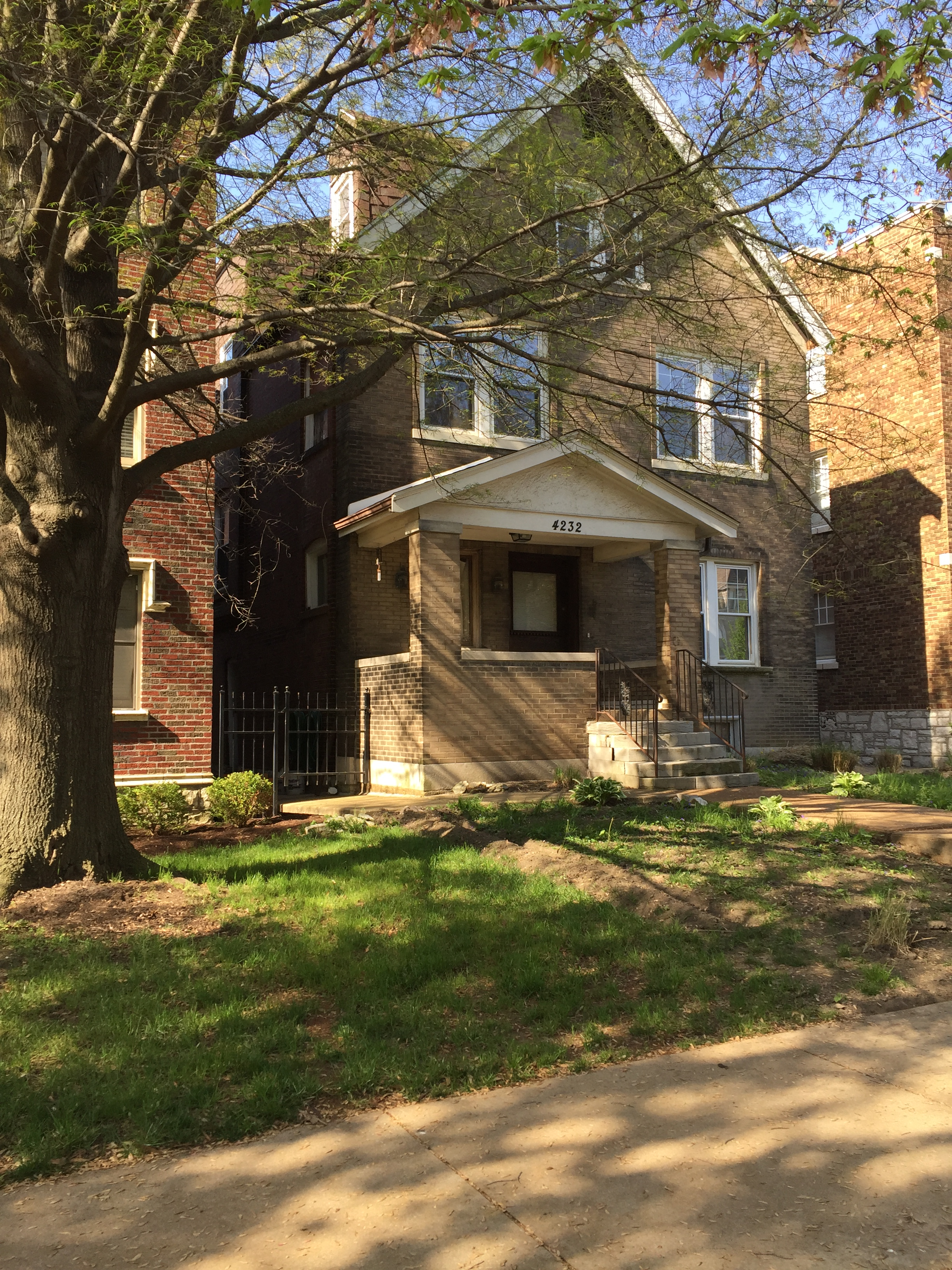
- Kate Chopin House

- Location within St. Louis Location within Missouri Location within the United States
- Location: 4232 McPherson Ave., St. Louis, Missouri
- Coordinates: 38°38′35″N 90°14′56″W
- Area: 0.1 acres (0.040 ha)
- Built by: Humphrey, Oscar F.
- NRHP reference No.: 86000209
- Added to NRHP: February 14, 1986

The Kate Chopin House, located at 4232 McPherson Avenue in St. Louis, Missouri, is the former home of author Kate Chopin. The house was built in 1897 by contractor Oscar F. Humphrey. Chopin moved to the house in 1903 and lived there until her death in 1904; while living in the house, she wrote her last poem and story. Chopin grew up in St. Louis before moving to Louisiana with her husband; after his death, she returned to St. Louis, where she began her writing career. Her stories discussed the evolving role of women in American society, and contemporary literary critics considered her one of the most significant St. Louis authors of the period. The house at 4232 McPherson is her only surviving former residence in St. Louis.

The house was added to the National Register of Historic Places on February 14, 1986.

== See also ==
- Kate Chopin House (Cloutierville, Louisiana), Chopin's home in Louisiana
