= Jack Kerouac House =

- U.S. National Register of Historic Places
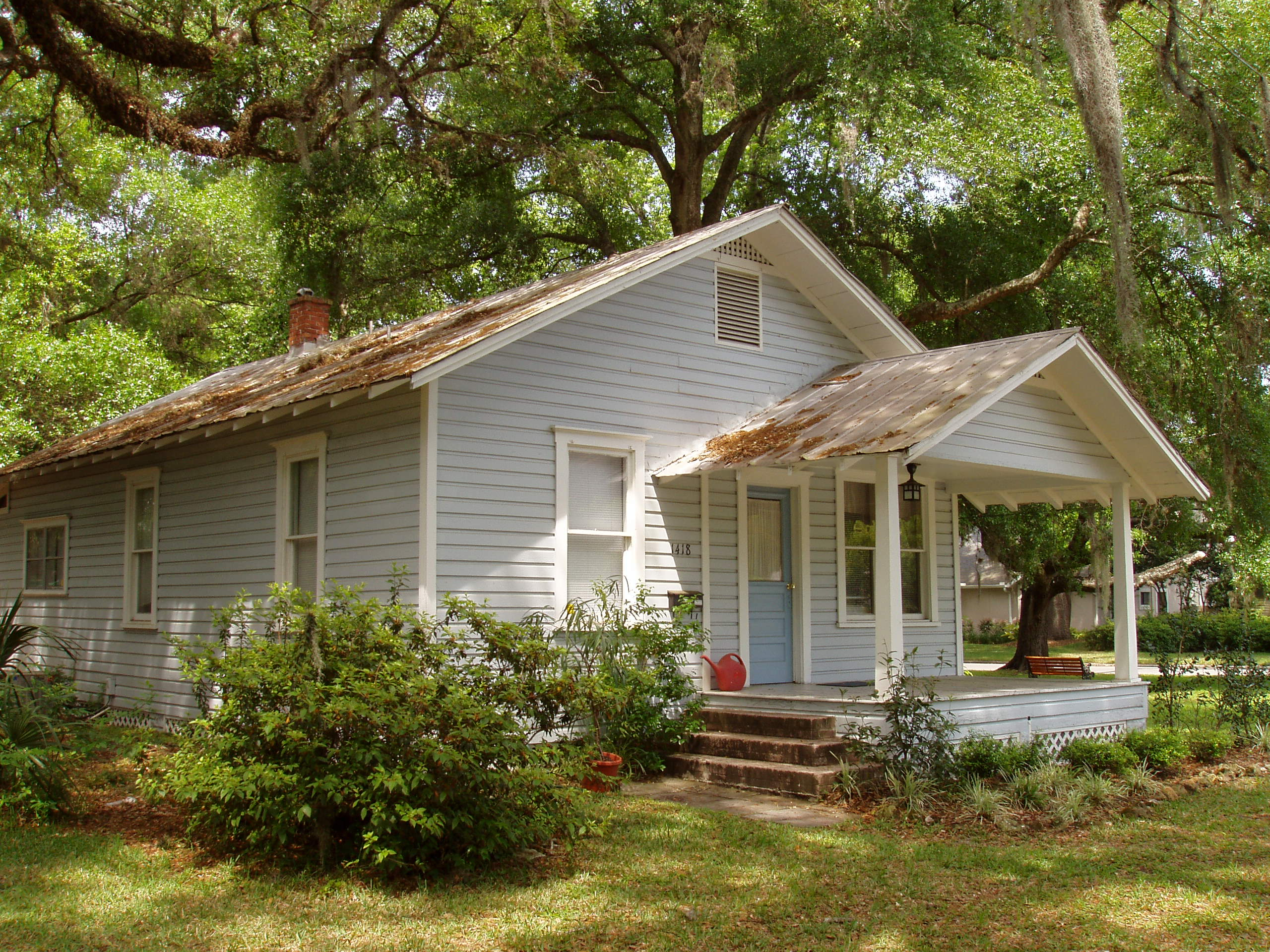
- Jack Kerouac House

- Location within Florida Location within the United States
- Location: 1418 Clouser Ave., Orlando, Florida
- Coordinates: 28°33′52″N 81°23′30″W
- Built: 1925
- NRHP reference No.: 12001254
- Added to NRHP: February 6, 2013

Jack Kerouac House is a historic house located in Orlando, Florida. Built as a rectangular, one-story, front-gable, Frame Vernacular house, it was the home of the American author and Beat Generation founder Jack Kerouac. The home was constructed in 1925 by Daniel Clouser, who erected other homes in Longwood and Orlando's College Park neighborhood.

It was added to the National Register of Historic Places in 2013. Currently, is used by The Jack Kerouac Writers in Residence Project of Orlando, Inc. as a place to award successful applicants to its residency program with a four to seven week rent-free stay.

== History and description ==
Daniel Clouser, who previously worked for the Erie Railroad in Pennsylvania, moved to Florida around 1907 after visiting his older brother. By the time of the 1920s Florida land boom, he lived in Longwood. Clouser built some homes in Longwood and Orlando's College Park neighborhood. In 1925, he constructed a home at 1418 Clouser Avenue, near the corner of Clouser Avenue and Shady Lane Drive. According to an excerpt from a paper about a semester-long undergraduate research project by a University of Central Florida student, "the widely accepted story is that the house was a post-World War I build-your-own home from Sears and was erected on a plot of land that was once a citrus grove."

Built as a rectangular, one-story, front-gable, Frame Vernacular house, it was the home of the American author and Beat Generation founder Jack Kerouac. Although Kerouac only stayed inside the home in 1957 and 1958, it was there that he completed the final edits to his breakthrough novel On the Road and authored The Dharma Bums in 11 days and nights and the Beat Generation in 24 hours, a three-play act. He rented this house, which his mother also lived in, due to its proximity to other relatives. Kerouac resided in Orlando again with his mother for another brief period in the early 1960s on the west side of the city.

After WESH reported Bob Kealing learned that Kerouac lived at this house, he and Marty Cummins, an employee of bookshop in College Park, established the Jack Kerouac Writers in Residence Project in 1997. Currently, the organization provides four to seven week residencies for free to selected applicants, excluding travel costs. In 2001, the Florida Legislature allocated $82,000 for assistance in paying off the mortgage and restoring the structure. The Jack Kerouac House was added to the National Register of Historic Places on February 6, 2013.

== See also ==
- National Register of Historic Places listings in Orange County, Florida
- The Jack Kerouac Writers in Residence Project of Orlando, Inc.
