= The Third Alarm =

The Third Alarm may refer to:

- The Third Alarm (1930 film), an American pre-Code drama film
- The Third Alarm (1922 film), an American silent melodrama
