= The Shield of Honor =

1927 film

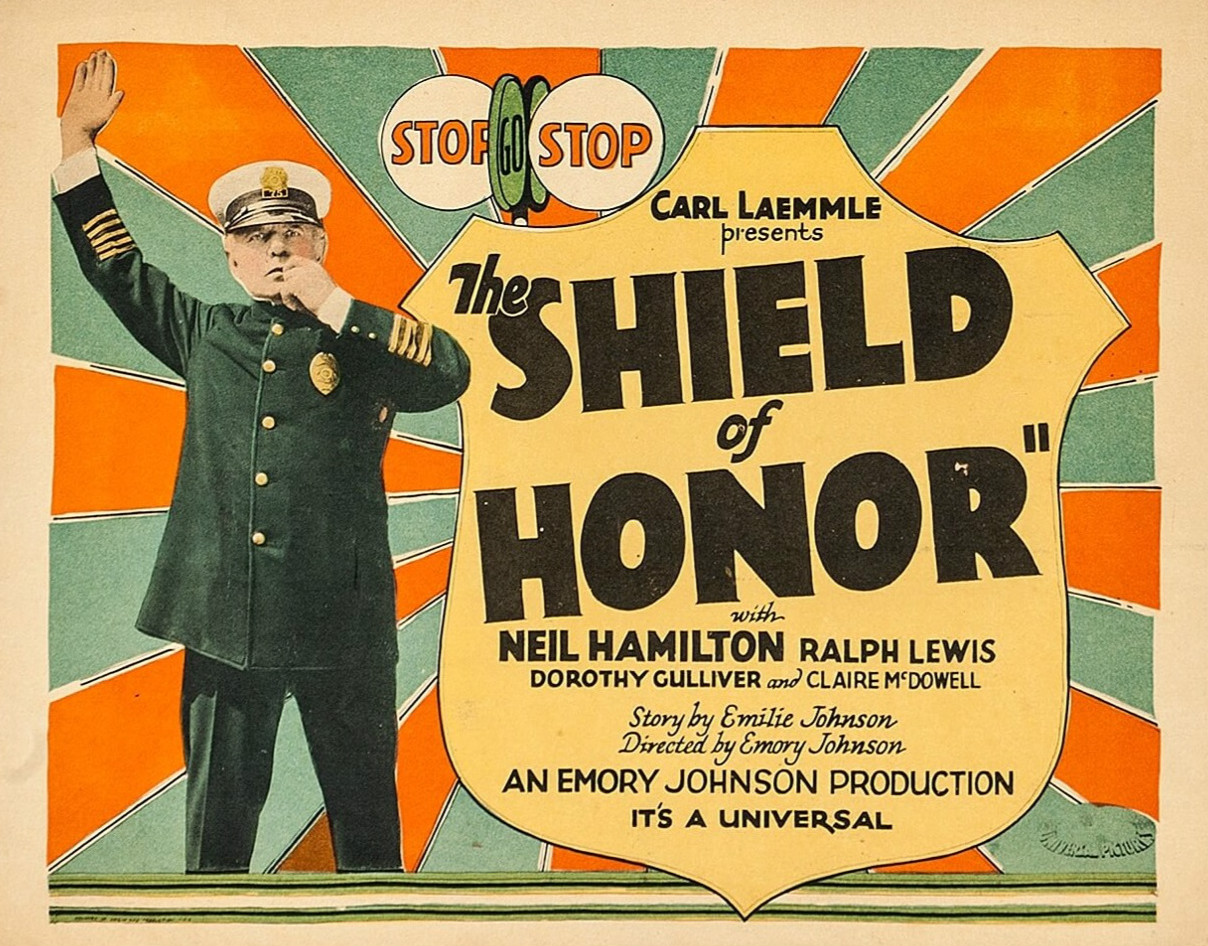
- Lobby card
- Directed by: Emory Johnson
- Screenplay by: Gladys Lehman; Leigh Jacobson
- Based on: Original story by Emilie Johnson
- Produced by: Universal Pictures Jewel
- Starring: Neil Hamilton; Dorothy Gulliver
- Cinematography: Ross Fisher
- Layouts by: Charles Hall
- Color process: Black and White
- Distributed by: Universal Pictures
- Release date: December 10, 1927 (New York City)
- Running time: 6 reels
- Country: United States
- Languages: Silent (English intertitles); English titles by Viola Brothers Shore

The Shield of Honor (1927) by Emory Johnson

The Shield of Honor is a 1927 American silent crime drama film directed by Emory Johnson based on the original story by Emilie Johnson. It starred Neil Hamilton, Dorothy Gulliver, and Ralph Lewis. This film explores a new branch of law enforcement - the Sky Cops. We follow the story of Jack MacDowell, the department's first pilot. During his new duties, Jack acquires a love interest and enlists the help of his retired father. They all work together, attempting to solve a series of diamond heists. Jack and his father deal with burning buildings, exchanging gunfire with jewel thieves, and a spectacular aerial battle. They finally arrest the perpetrators. Following its New York City premiere on December 10, 1927, the film was released on February 18, 1928, by Universal Pictures.

== Plot ==
This film opens with veteran police officers Dan MacDowell (Ralph Lewis), and his son Jack MacDowell (Neil Hamilton) attending a ceremony. The event is celebrating the addition of a new airplane to the law enforcement group. Jack MacDowell will become the police plane's first flying officer. Also, participating in the celebration is Gwen O'Day (Dorothy Gulliver). She is the daughter of a wealthy jeweler named Howard O'Day (Fred Esmelton). Gwen is chosen to christen the new police plane with a bottle of Champaign. During the christening, Jack MacDowell develops a fascination for beautiful Gwen. The feeling is mutual. The celebration culminates with a review of the force.

Film's opening dedication to Police
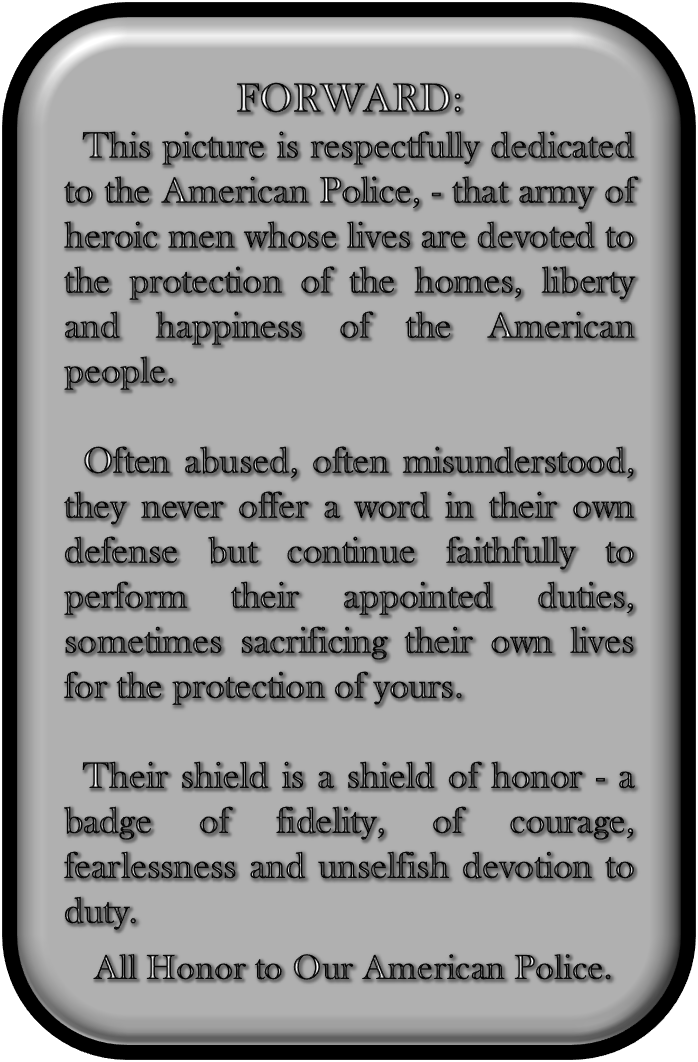

After the ceremony's conclusion, we find another major jewel robbery that has happened in the city. We further discover that only O'Day's customers were the victims of burglaries. Somehow, all the robberies trace back to the O'Day jewelry store. All the thieves remain unsolved. Howard is determined to solve these crimes but can't make any headway on his own. Howard asks Jack MacDowell if he can do a police investigation of the diamond thefts. Gwen overhears her father's request and secretly asks if she can assist too.

Meanwhile, Dan MacDowell turns sixty-five. Under police department regulations, this is the mandatory age of retirement from the police force. Dan is forced to retire. Even though he is retired, Dan still wants to be involved in law enforcement. Howard O'Day gives Dan a security job at the jewelry store. He is the new night watchman.

Jack and Gwen continue to hunt for clues about the jewel thefts. In addition to his watchman duties, Dan MacDowell is also assisting in detective work. After investigating several clues, Jack whittles his suspect list down to one man, Howard's business advisor, Robert Chandler, played by Nigel Barrie. But Jack and Gwen still have not gathered enough evidence to press charges. Unbeknown to Jack and Gwen, Robert Chandler is the leader of a gang of jewel thieves. Other members of the group include Rose Fisher (Thelma Todd), O'Day's stenographer, and Red (David Kirby), the store janitor. They have a straightforward plan. Steal from the jewelry store customer, then sell the jewels back to the store.

Jack and Gwen continue their investigation. Then another burglary is carried out. This time they rob the actual O'Day jewelry store of precious diamonds. During the commission of the crime, Gwen discovers the thieves; they, in turn, lock her in the vault and set the building on fire. The thieves make their escape and board a waiting plane. They will make their escape in the air. Jack catches wind of the robbery, but this time, he knows who did it. Jack and his father rush to the police plane, jump in the cockpit, strap up and take to the air. They give chase to the fugitive's plane. After catching up with the criminals, a night aerial battle takes place. When the smoke settles, the jewel thieves are rounded up and arrested. We confirm Chandler is the leader of a gang of jewel thieves.

Jack MacDowell, the department's first aviator detective, has proven the worth of an airplane in law enforcement. He becomes the shining example of the newest branch of the law - the Sky Cops. Even though Dan MacDowell is Sixty-five, the department waives the mandatory retirement, and he is allowed to rejoin the force. Jack is a hero and marries Gwen.

== Cast ==
Actor	Role
Neil Hamilton	Jack MacDowell
Dorothy Gulliver	Gwen O'Day
Ralph Lewis	Dan MacDowell
Nigel Barrie	Robert Chandler
Claire McDowell	Mrs. MacDowell
Fred Esmelton	Howard O'Day
Harry Northrup	A. E. Blair
Thelma Todd	Rose Fisher
David Kirby	Red
Joseph W. Girard	Chief of Police
William Bakewell	Jerry MacDowell
Hank	himself, a dog

== Pre-production ==
=== Marketing ===
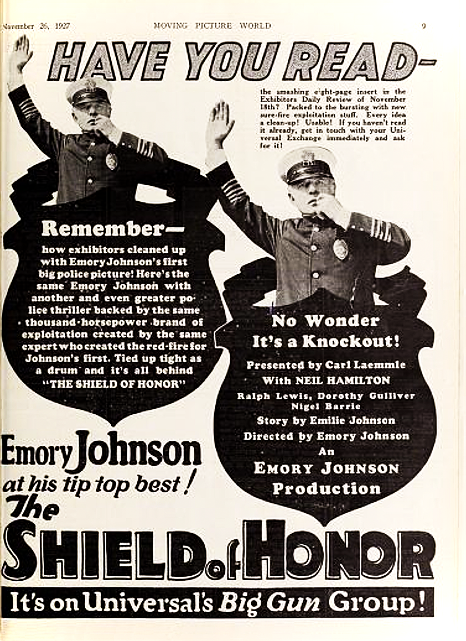
Advertisement

Based on an American Film Institute standard, films with a running time of forty-five minutes or longer are considered feature films. In 1915, feature films were becoming more the trend in Hollywood. In 1916, Universal formed a three-tier branding system for their releases. Universal films decided to label their films according to the size of their budget and status. Bear in mind, Universal, unlike the top-tier studios, did not own any theaters to market its feature films. By branding their product, Universal gave theater owners and audiences a quick reference guide. Branding would help theater owners judge films they were about to lease and help fans decide which movies they wanted to see.

Universal released three different types of feature motion pictures:

- Red feather Photoplays – low budget feature films
- Bluebird Photoplays – Mainstream feature release and more ambitious productions
- Jewel – prestige motion pictures featuring big budgets using prominent actors

This film carried Universal's "Jewel" branding, designating top-shelf motion pictures featuring big budgets with all-star casts.

=== Theme ===
This film is the second effort by Emory Johnson to glorify the brave men in blue. The first film to start the series of "Glorifying the men in uniform" men in uniform" was In the Name of the Law. This film and showing their everyday dedication to duty, also interweaves love, adventure, and a series of crimes.

=== Screenplay ===
Emilie Johnson was Emory Johnson's mother. She developed the stories for the majority of films directed by her son. The basis of this film was the original Emilie Johnson story In the Name of the Law. By the time this movie was produced, Emilie Johnson was no longer writing screenplays. Adaption and screenwriting duties fell to a team of three writers, Leigh Jacobson, Gladys Lehman, and Viola Brothers Shore.

=== Casting ===
Ralph Lewis was cast as the veteran 65-year old policeman Dan MacDowell. Casting Lewis in this role made sense since he was featured prominently in the Emory Johnson 1922 production of In the Name of the Law. In that film, he played policeman Pat O'Hara. Lewis was now 55 years old, saying he was too old for a leading man. In another ironic twist, Claire McDowell plays Dan MacDowell's wife. In the 1922 film In the Name of the Law, she played the wife of Pat O'Hara. 28-year-oldJames Neil Hamilton received the starring role of Jack MacDowell. 19-year-old Dorothy Gulliver earned the role of leading lady Gwen O'Day.

== Production ==
=== Location ===
Filming the externals for this film took place in Exposition Park located in Los Angeles. The remainder of the filming was at Universal Studios located at 100 Universal City Plaza in Universal City, California.

== Post-production ==
This film's theatrical release totaled six reels or 6,173 feet of film. As is often the case, the listed time for this feature-length movie varies. The average time per 1,000-foot 35mm reel varied between ten and fifteen minutes per reel at the time. Thus, the total time for this movie is computed between sixty and eighty minutes.

=== Exploitation ===
- The film's producers decided to use the same successful approach used to increase revenues for In the Name of the Law. That exploitation strategy is fully explained in more detail in In the Name of the Law. Briefly, the approach was to team city police departments with local theater owners to promote the film mutually.
- On three traffic signals in downtown Los Angeles, the police posted signs reading, "Stop! See The Shield of Honor - Boulevard Theater"

=== Anecdotes ===
- A newspaper article claims no law enforcement officials will find fault with the scenes featuring the drill team squads. The reason is they were all performed by real policemen. All characters in the film, except for the cast, was shot with real law enforcement officers. The article also states 1,500 policemen of the Los Angeles Police Department were employed during the shooting of the action scenes for the film.
- This article states on the film's opening night, they featured the Los Angeles Police Quartet. The article also mentioned the Los Angeles Police Department's drill squad was on stage during another showing of this film.

=== Alternate title ===
Several magazines mistakenly list the title of this film as "Shield of Honor." The official copyrighted title of this film is "The Shield of Honor."

=== Release and reception ===
The film was copyrighted on February 11, 1927, under LP24621. The film premiered in New York City on December 10, 1927. The official film release date to US theaters was February 18, 1928.

The critics published mostly positive reviews. One newspaper critic especially liked Universal's use of "magnificent settings, gorgeous costumes, a perfectly balanced cast, superb direction, and beautiful photography."

A sampling of reviews is shown below.

In the December 30, 1927 issue of the Motion Picture News, E. G. Johnston points out

. . . Emory Johnson's picture has some bang-up action and timely airplane material that will score with the average audience. No other director in this business has had more experience with pictures of the kind and Mr. Johnson has not failed to add an interesting yeard to the glorification of this country's police departments.

In the May 13, 1928, issue of The San Bernardino Sun, Sue Bernardine observes

. . . a picture designed in tribute to the new department of the guardians of the law, "the sky cop," . . .It is said to be of the thrilling type, depicting the police of the sky in real action.

=== Final universal film ===
In June 1927, Emory Johnson signed a new nine-picture deal with Universal. The first film Johnson releases under his new Universal contract is The Fourth Commandment. In September 1927, Johnson releases The Lone Eagle. In February 1928, Johnson released The Shield of Honor. After completing three successful movies for Universal, Johnson reneges on the remainder of his nine-picture contract. He negotiated a new contract with Poverty Row studio, Tiffany-Stahl Productions. Emory Johnson would not direct another film until 1930.

== Preservation status ==
A report created by film historian and archivist David Pierce for the Library of Congress claims:

- 75% of original silent-era films have perished.
- 14% of the 10,919 silent films released by major studios exist in their original 35mm or other formats.
- 11% survive in full-length foreign versions or on film formats of lesser image quality. Many silent-era films did not survive for reasons as explained on this Wikipedia page.

Emory Johnson directed 13 films - 11 were silent, and 2 were Talkies. The Shield of Honor was the third and final film in Emory Johnson's eight-picture contract with Universal. The film's original length is listed at 6 reels. According to the Library of Congress website, prints of The Shield of Honor survive at the George Eastman House Motion Picture Collection and UCLA Film and Television Archive. DVDs of film are available from multiple vendors.

== Gallery ==
Players and director
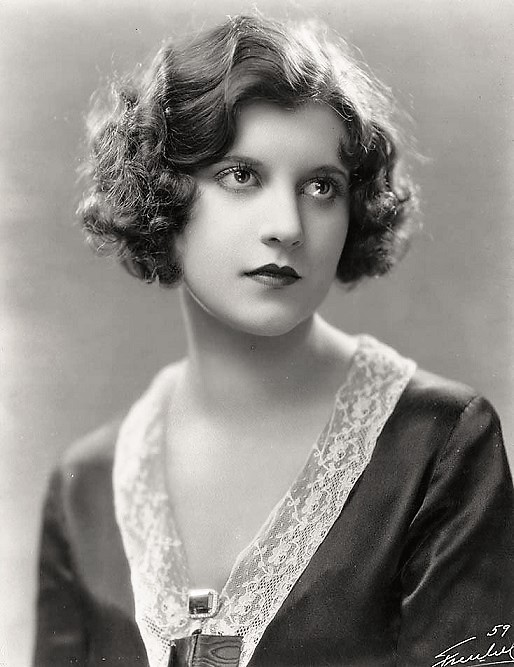
Dorothy Gulliver
Gwen O'Day

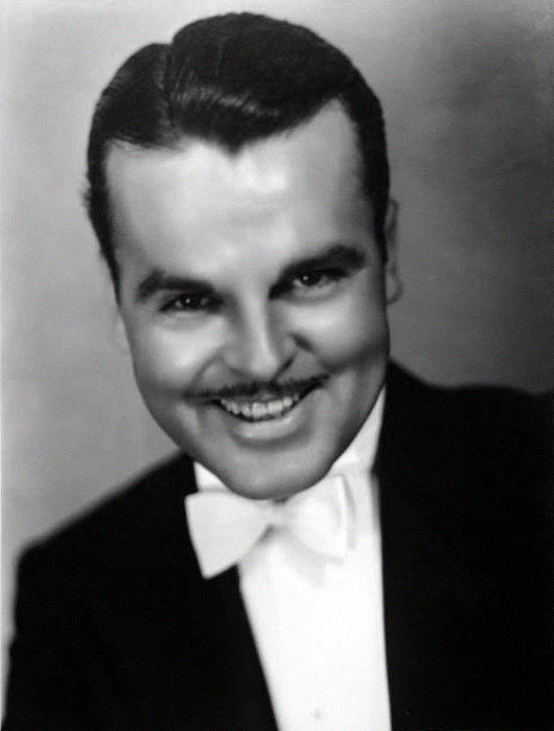
Neil Hamilton
Jack MacDowell

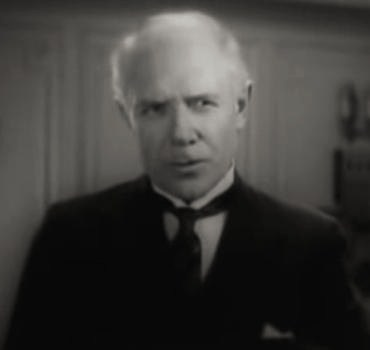
Ralph Lewis
Dan MacDowell

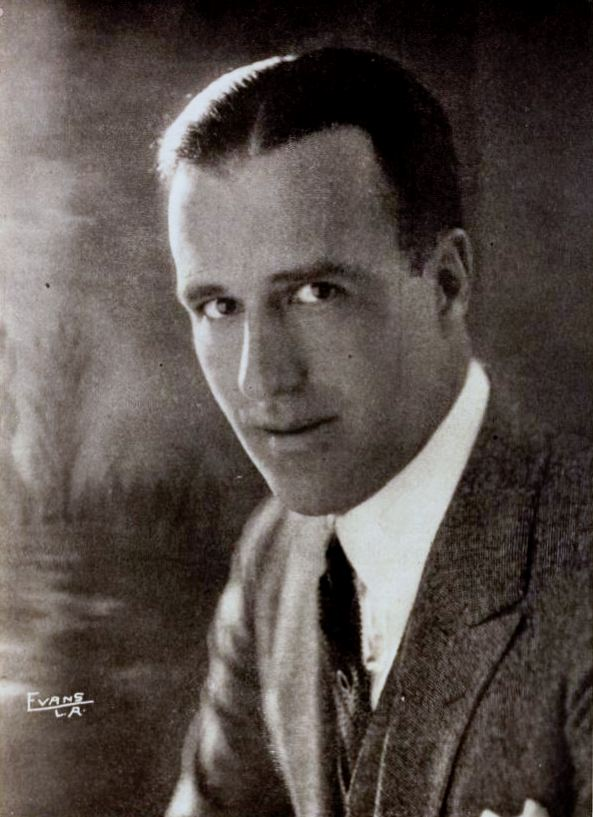
Nigel Barrie
Robert Chandler

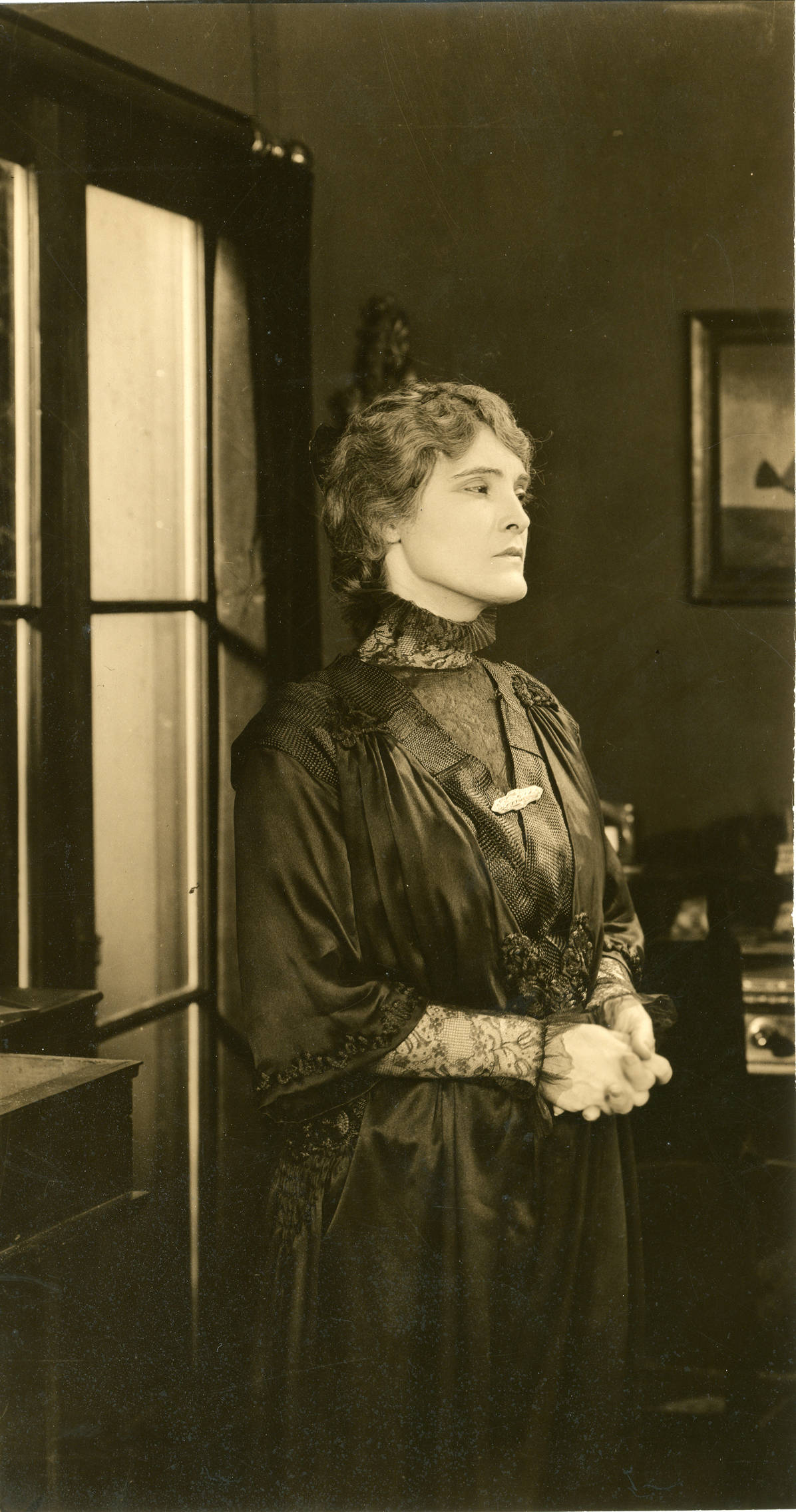
Claire McDowell
Mrs. MacDowell

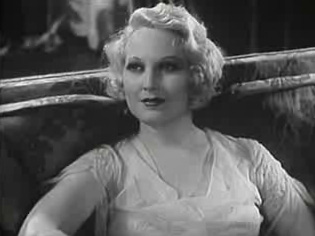
Thelma Todd
Rose Fisher

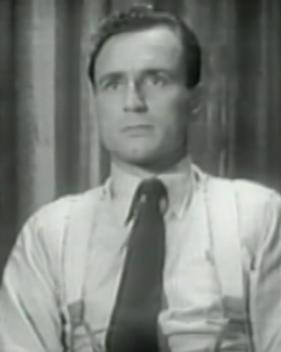
William Bakewell
Jerry MacDowell

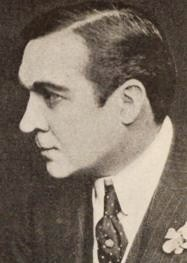
Harry Northrup
A. E. Blair

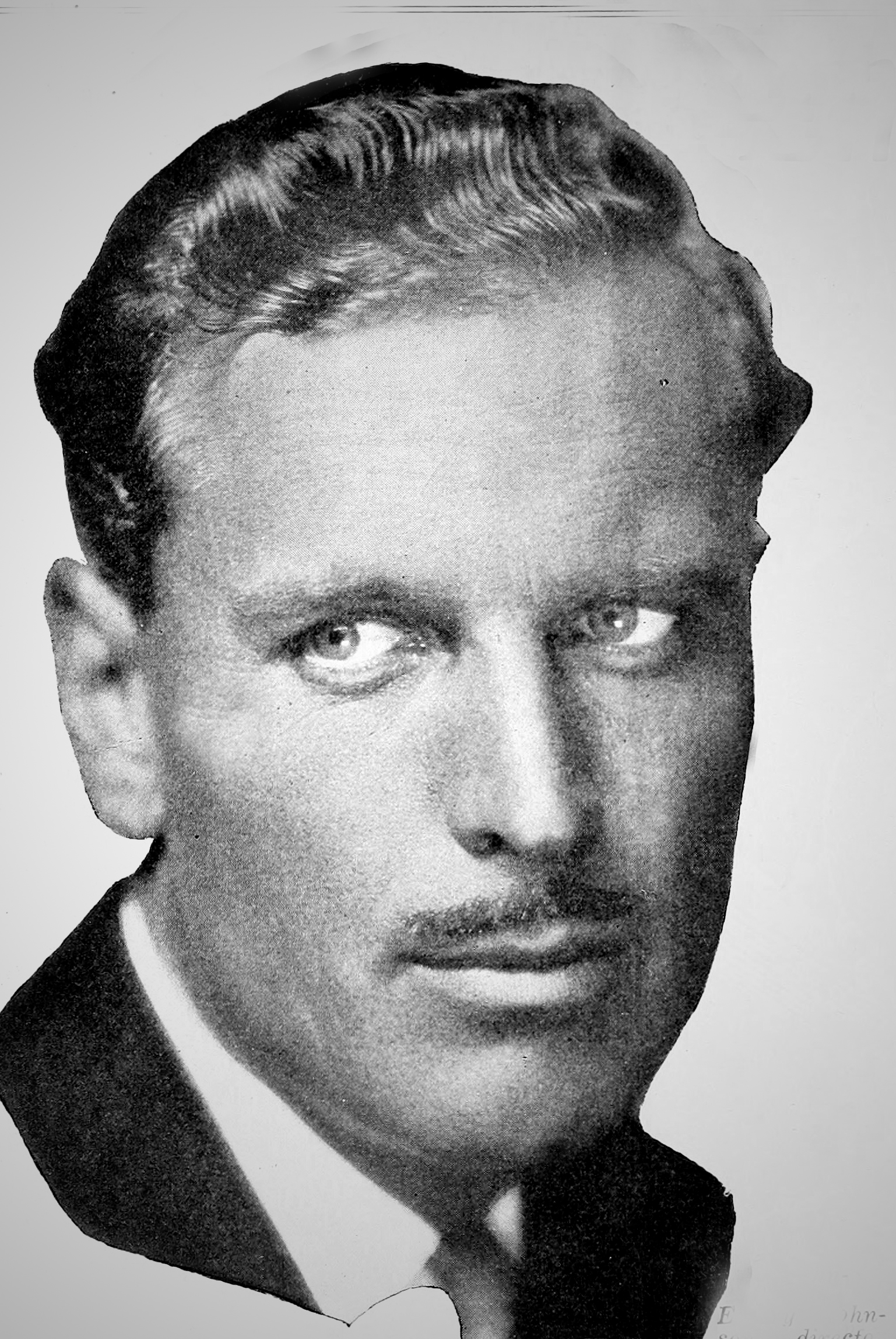
Emory Johnson
Director
