= Emilie Johnson =

Swedish-American author and movie producer (1867–1941)

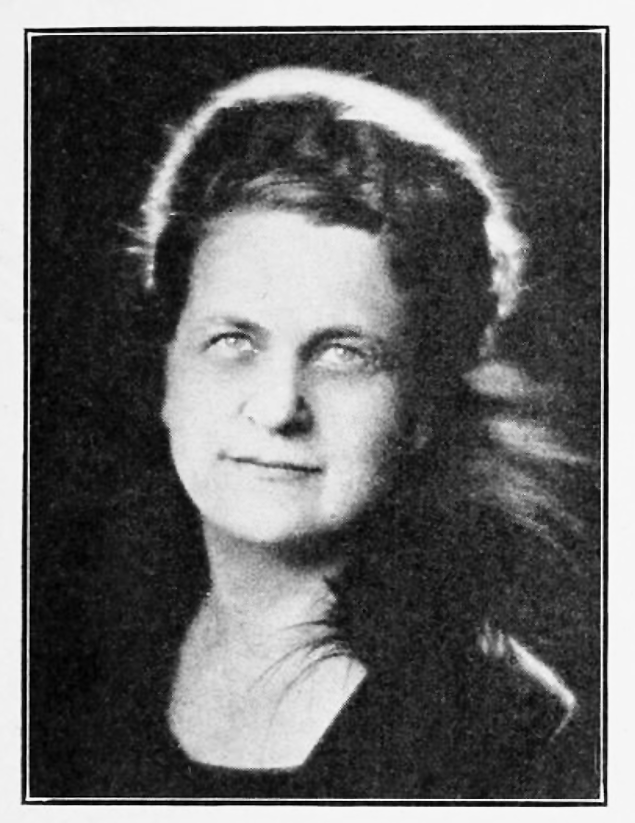
- Born: June 3, 1867; Gothenburg, Sweden
- Died: September 23, 1941 (aged 74); Hollywood, California
- Occupations: Writer; scenarist; producer
- Years active: 1914–1930
- Children: Emory Johnson

Emilie Johnson (June 3, 1867 – September 23, 1941) was a Swedish-American author, scenarist, and movie producer. She was the mother of American actor, director, producer, and writer Emory Johnson. In 1912, Emory Johnson dropped out of college and embarked upon a career in the movie business, starting as an assistant camera operator at Essanay Studios.

In 1913, Emilie Johnson and her husband moved from San Francisco, California to Essanay company bungalows in Niles, California to support their son. In 1915, she began writing stories for the screen.

In the 1920s, Johnson and her son became famous as Hollywood's only mother-son directing/writing team. She wrote all of the stories and screenplays her son used for his successful career directing melodramas. The Johnson team continued producing melodramas until the late 1920s. By the early 1930s, their string of successes had ended. Emilie Johnson died in Los Angeles in 1941. She was living with her son at the time of her death.

== Early life ==
Emilie Johnson was born Emilie Matilda Jönsdotter in Gothenburg, Västra Götaland, Sweden on June 3, 1867. When she was eight years old, her school in Karlskrona was visited by a Church of Sweden Lutheran minister. As part of his tour, he read three stanzas of poetry by young Emilie Jönsdotter. Impressed, he asked her parents if they would consider letting him adopt her. The minister would assume responsibility for her upbringing and education if they consented. The minister was an up-and-coming member of the Lutheran Church and a prominent writer in Sweden. Jönsdotter's parents agreed to the arrangement, realizing the minister could provide educational opportunities they could never afford. The minister became a bishop and eventually an adviser to the King of Sweden.

Jönsdotter's education continued until the bishop died. Afterward, she migrated to America. She arrived in San Francisco on September 24, 1891. She was 25 years old and unmarried. While living in San Francisco, she met Alfred Johnson. The two fell in love and married at the Ebenezer Lutheran Church in San Francisco on May 11, 1893. Their only child, Alfred Emory Johnson, was born in San Francisco on March 16, 1894.

In 1900, the Johnson family lived comfortably on Bush Street in San Francisco. Johnson's husband owned a famous Turkish bathhouse. The family lived in a fine house and had live-in servants. In 1906, the catastrophic San Francisco earthquake changed everything. The quake caused numerous fires throughout the city. One fire destroyed Johnson's bathhouse. The family survived the quake and resettled in nearby Alameda, California.

By 1910, Johnson's husband supported the family by helping to establish the famous Piedmont baths. Emilie continued to raise their son, and attended California College of the Arts as an art major.

In 1912, Emory Johnson entered the movie business as an assistant cameraman. Later, he signed a movie contract with Essanay Studios. In 1913, to more closely support their son's blossoming movie career, Emilie and her husband moved to one of the newly built Essanay bungalows in Niles, California.

== First chapter ==
In 1914, the Liberty Motion Picture Company was founded in Germantown, Pennsylvania. Five months later, the company reorganized into the Liberty Film Mfg Company, with offices located in San Mateo and Glendale, California.

That year, Emilie Johnson began writing scenarios for the silver screen. Later, she would meet and befriend a leading actress of Liberty Film Mfg. Co—Swedish actress Sadie Lindblom. They believed they were looking at an opportunity in the movie business. In addition to writing stories for the screen, they could exercise even more control by producing their films.

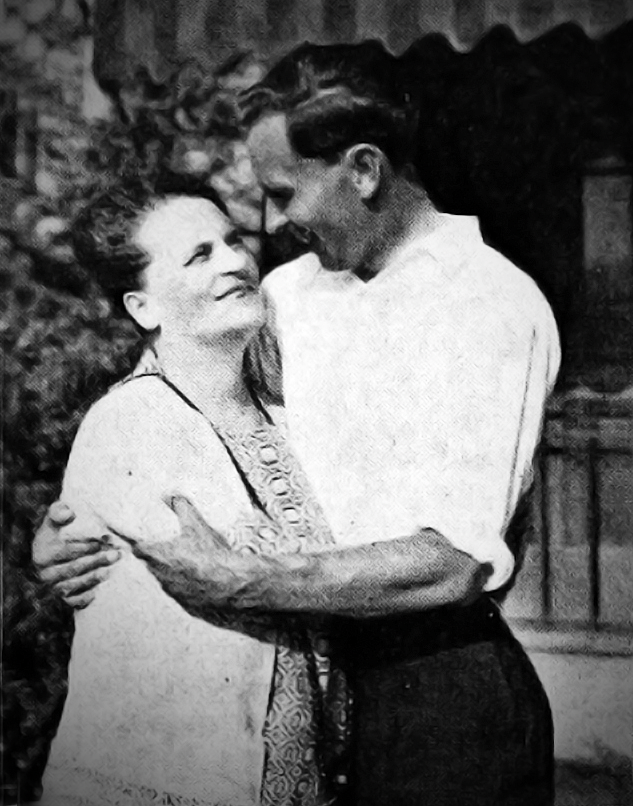
Emilie and Emory

The Liberty Film Company was incorporated in Oakland, California to keep up with their new writing and production strategy. The papers were drawn up, and the following individuals declared a capital stock investment of $25,000 (over $600,000 in today's money): Emilie Johnson (age 51), Alfred Johnson (age 54), Emory Johnson (age 21), Tillie Hall, and Sadie Lindblom (both age 25). Lindblom would be the new president.

Liberty Film Company began releasing films early in 1915, using the Kriterion Film Corporation as their releasing agent. By June 1915, Kriterion had cash flow problems, went bankrupt, and left Liberty Film with a $40,000 debt. After choosing a new releasing agent—Associated Service, Liberty Film Mfg Co floundered.

The Liberty Film Company completed several movies.

In late 1914, many actors and actresses left Essanay Studios. Many switched to Liberty Film. Several factors precipitated the talent exit, including Essanay's continued refusal to make more feature-length movies and the fact that Essanay was losing money. Included in the exit was Emilie's son. Emory Johnson's last film for Essanay was released in June 1914. On February 16, 1916, the Niles Essanay studio closed.

Liberty Films struggled with its new distributor. In December 1915, the courts appointed a new receiver. Liberty's Pennsylvania plant burned to the ground in 1916. At the beginning of 1916, Emory left Liberty and signed a contract with Universal Film Manufacturing Company. He would make seventeen movies in 1916, including six shorts and eleven feature-length dramas, the second-highest output of his career in a year.

1917 marked another noteworthy event for the Johnsons. In September, Emory Johnson, still under contract to Universal, married Universal ingenue Ella Hall. After their honeymoon, they both returned to work at Universal. Newlywed Ella then moved into the Franklin Avenue house along with Emory, Emile, and two servants. Grandson Walter Emory was born in January 1919. Alfred Bernard followed in September 1920.

== Hollywood decade ==
=== 1921 ===
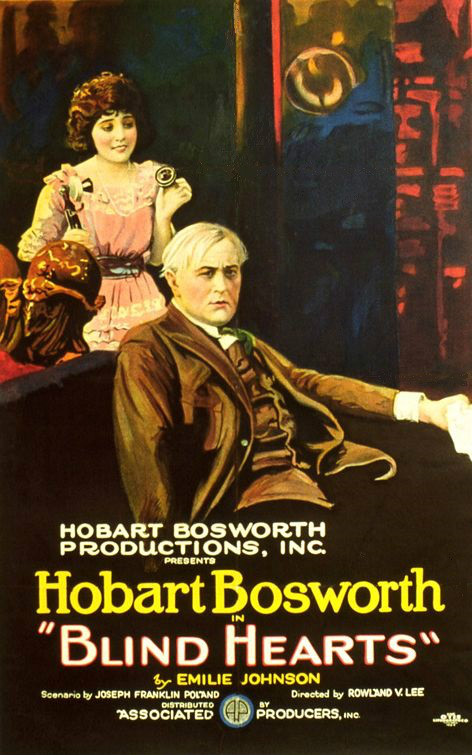
Lobby poster

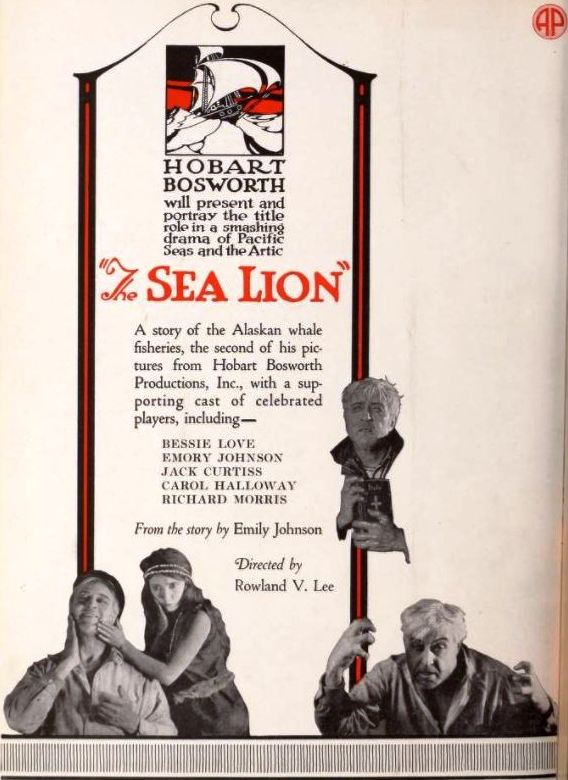
Lobby poster

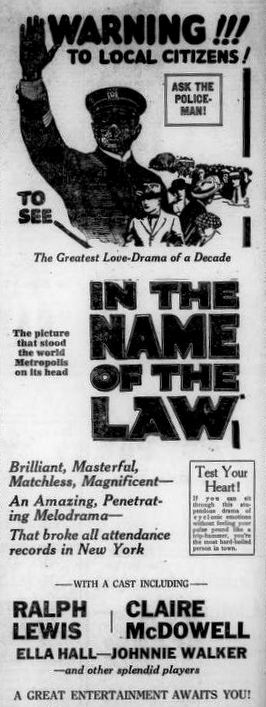
Newspaper ad

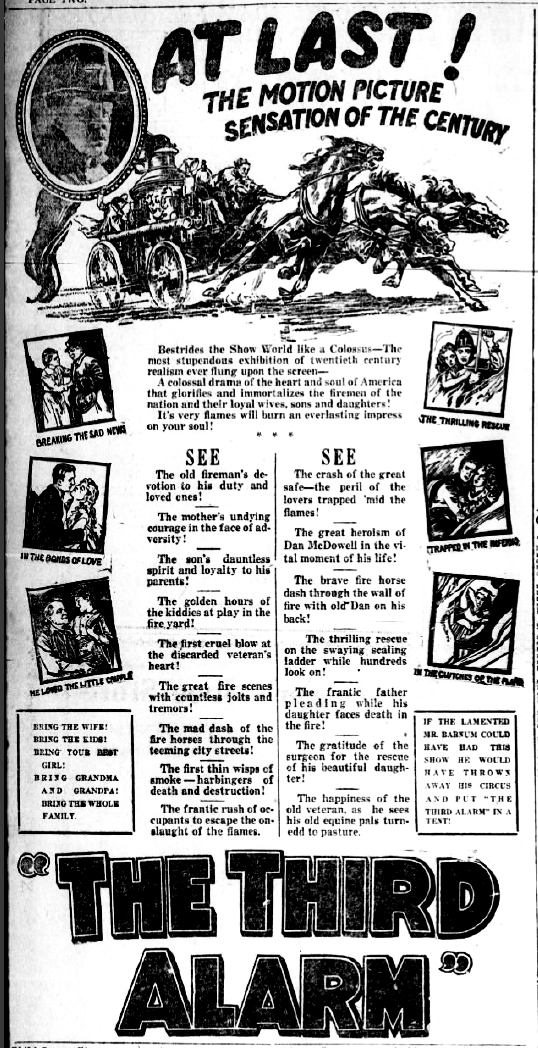
Magazine ad

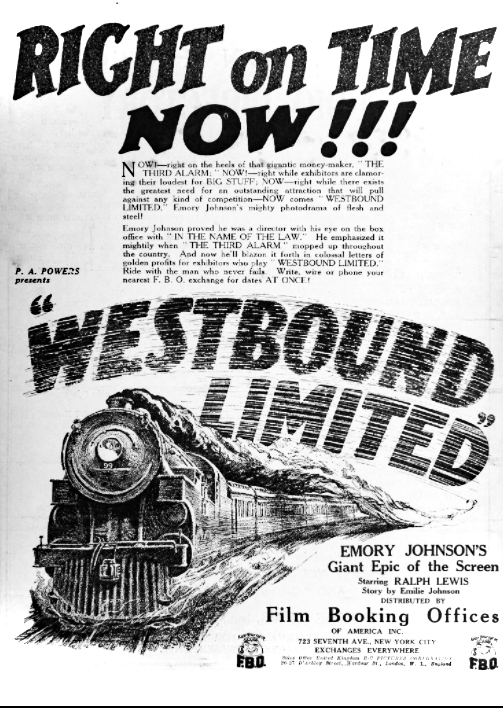
Magazine ad

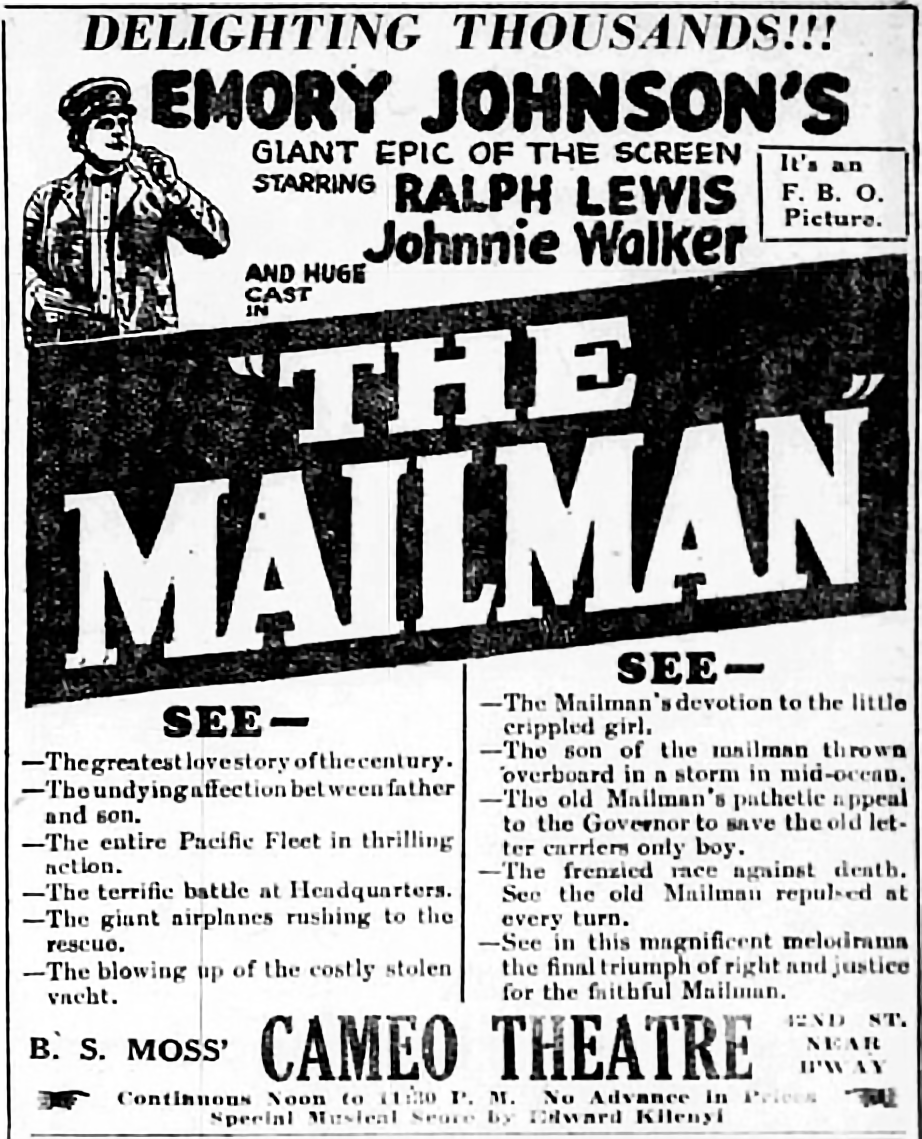
Newspaper ad

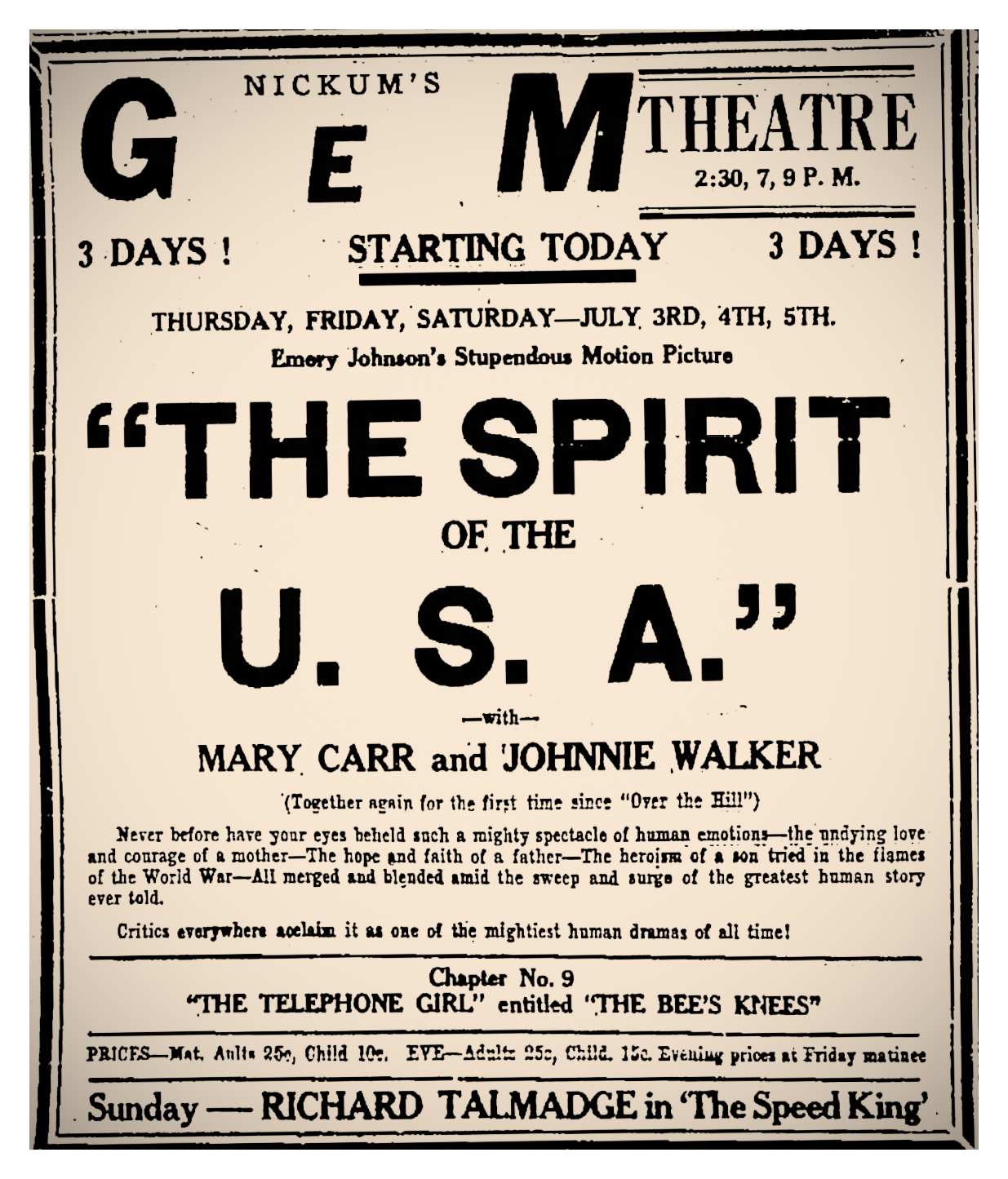
Newspaper ad

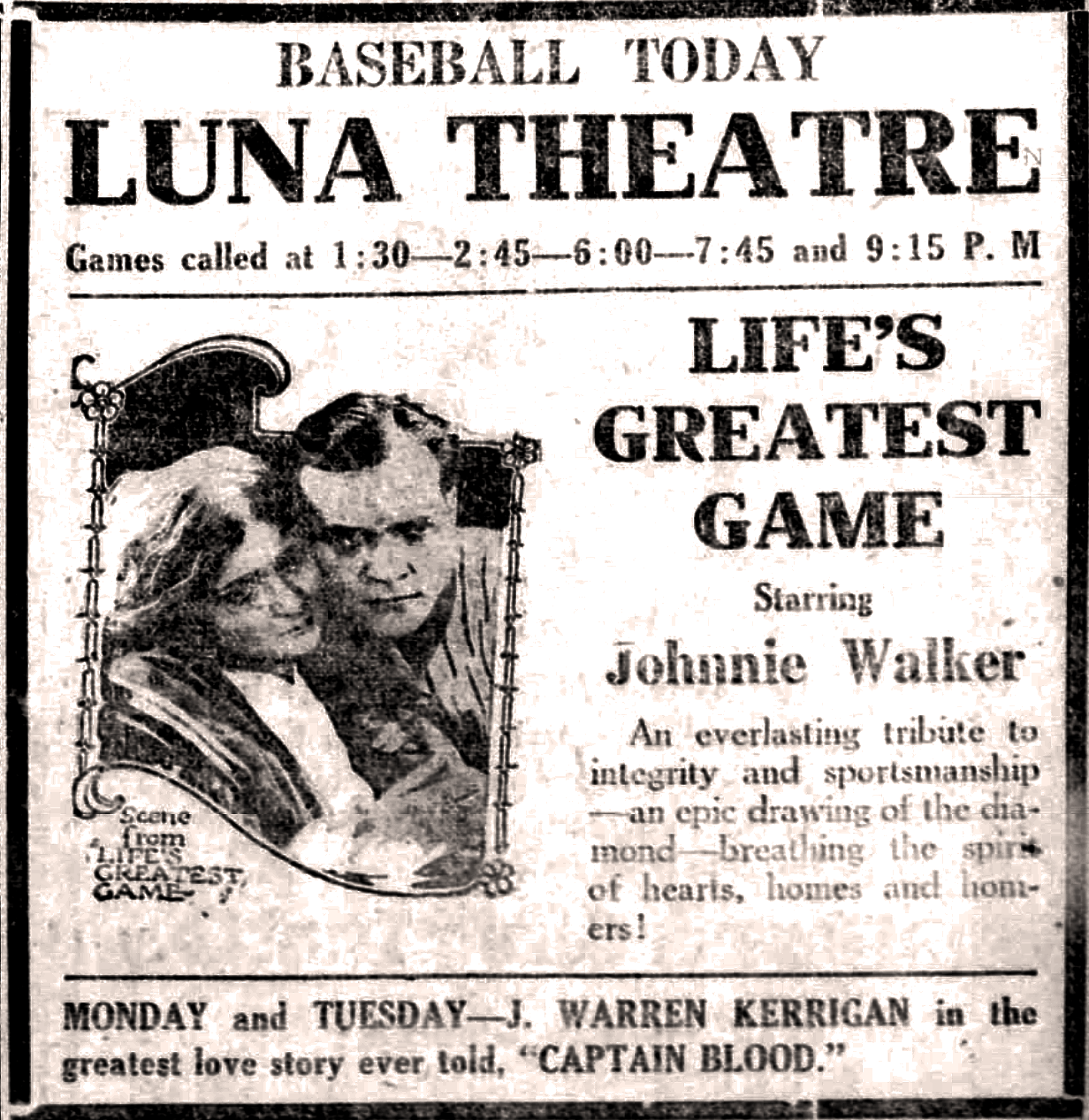
Newspaper ad

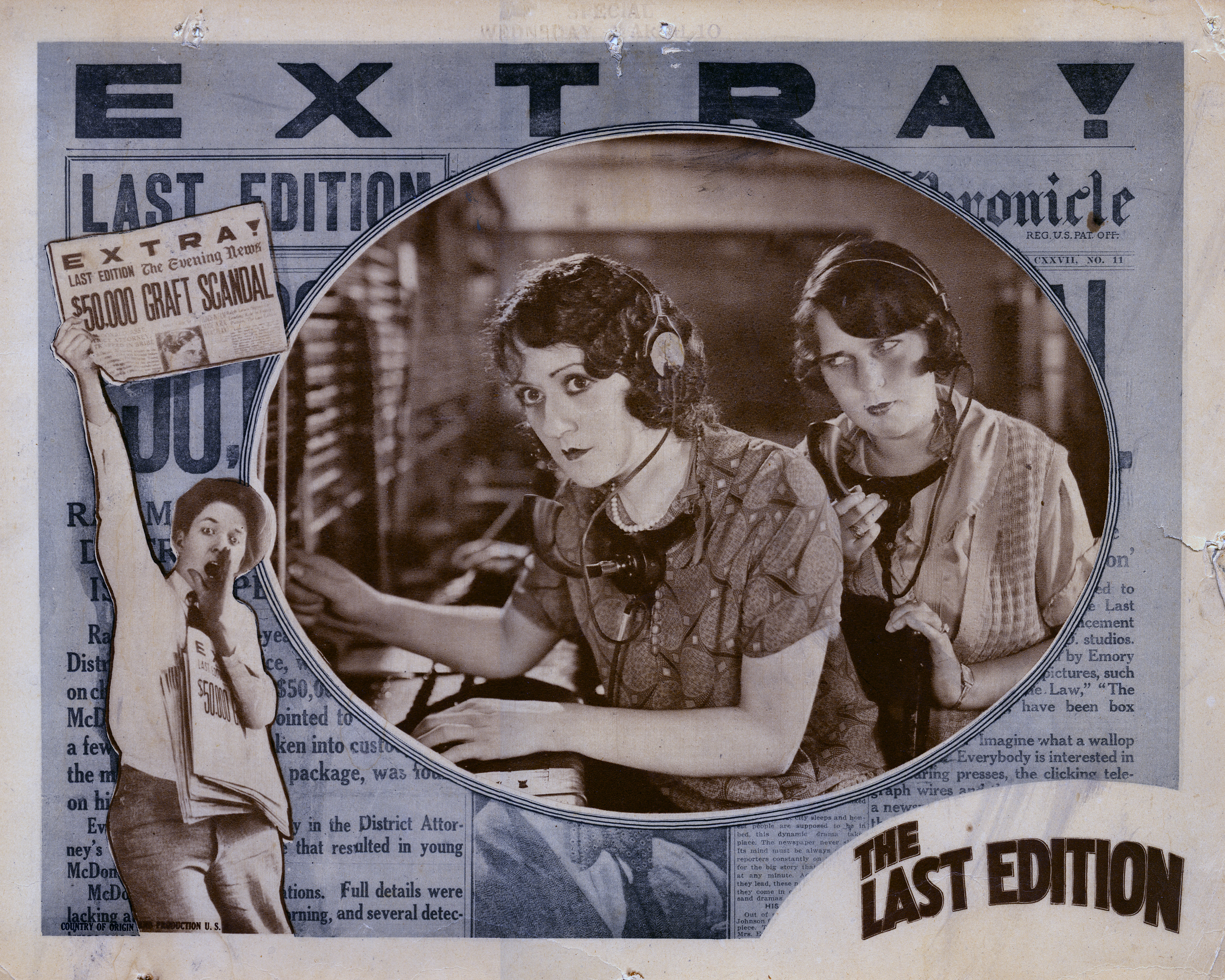
Lobby card

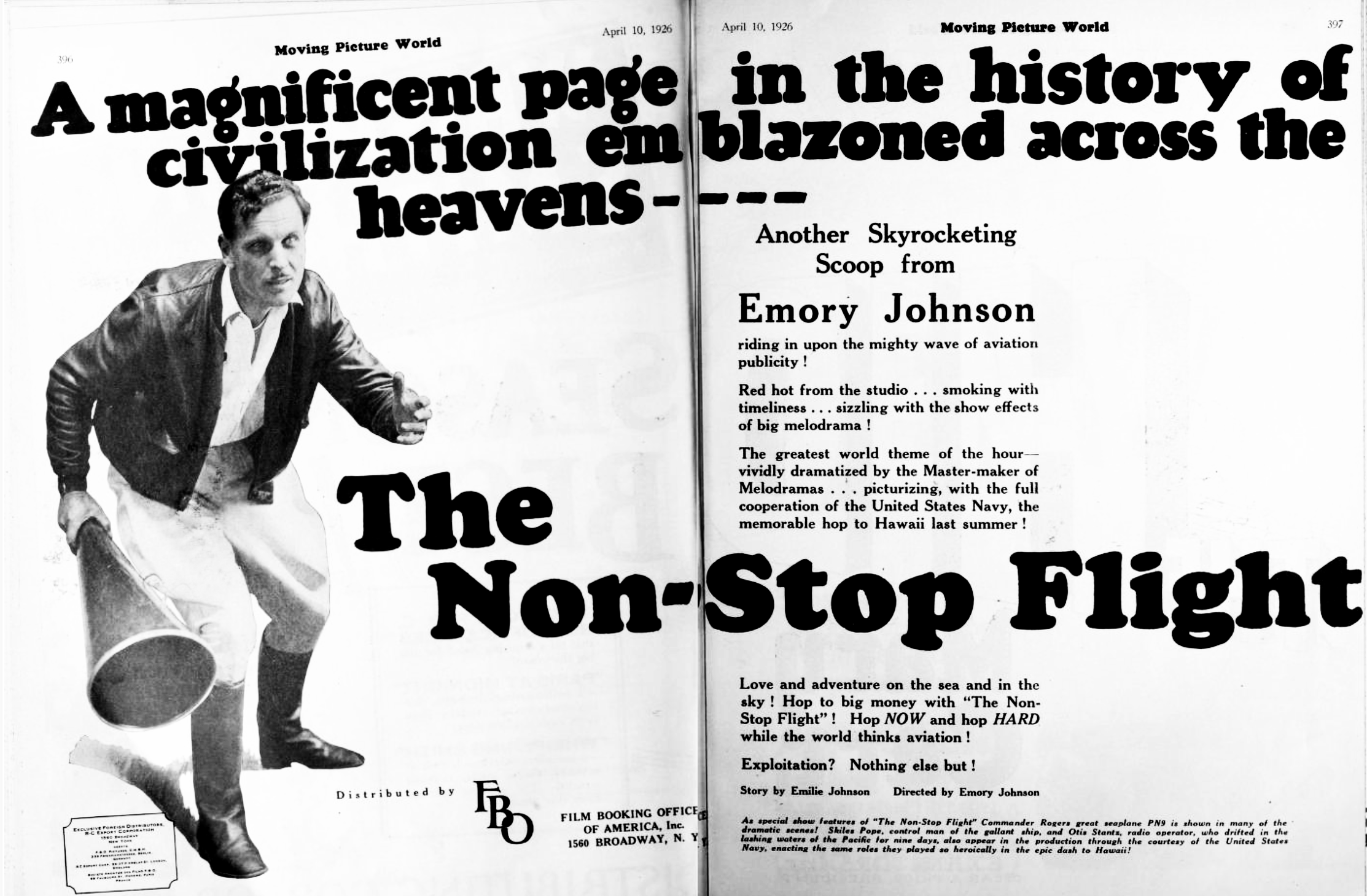
Magazine ad

This would be a watershed year for 54-year-old Emilie Johnson. Previously, she had written the story "Blind Hearts," which takes place in 1898. The tale unfolds as two men travel with their wives to Alaska, seeking fame and fortune. Hobart Bosworth Productions purchased the story. The film version was released in October 1921 and starred Hobart Bosworth and Wade Boteler.

That same year, Hobart Bosworth Productions picked up another Emilie Johnson project, The Sea Lion. This tale of adventure, romance, and intrigue occurred aboard a whaling vessel. The movie version was released in December 1921. The Sea Lion starred Hobart Bosworth, Bessie Love, and Emory Johnson.

=== 1922 ===
Emilie and her son had initially been contracted with Robertson-Cole to write, produce, and direct The Midnight Call. R-C was later acquired by FBO. On July 1, 1922, the Robertson-Cole Distribution Company became FBO. All R-C contracts were honored, especially with independent producers like Emory Johnson. In May, the Riverside Independent Enterprise published an article stating Emilie had written nineteen scenarios.

The first Johnson collaboration under the renamed FBO contract was The Midnight Call, which was renamed In the Name of the Law. The film was released in August 1922. Emilie Johnson was credited with both the story and screenplay for this melodrama. The story is about a San Francisco policeman trying to keep his family together while facing continuing adversity.

In December, FBO released The Third Alarm, formerly titled The Discard. This film is the second under the FBO contract. Emory directed this Emilie Johnson story about a firefighter forced into retirement who triumphantly returns to save the day. It had spectacular scenes of burning buildings and courage-fueled firefighters. The film would become the most financially successful movie ever produced in Johnson's career.

Emilie had four of her stories shown simultaneously:

- Blind Hearts, released October 3, 1921
- The Sea Lion, released December 5, 1921
- In the Name of the Law (aka The Midnight Call), released August 22, 1922
- The Third Alarm, released December 31, 1922

=== 1923 ===
The third film in the FBO contract was The West~Bound Limited. Emilie wrote both the story and screenplay. It is about railroad engineer Bill Buckley, who narrowly avoids injuring the daughter of the company's president by stopping his speeding train just in the nick of time. Various misfortunes ensue, Bill's son saves the daughter, and the film has a positive ending.

The fourth film in the FBO contract was The Mailman. Emilie again wrote both the story and the screenplay.

Emilie and Emory signed a new contract with FBO in September for 2.5 years. (Note: "Future Johnson attractions will be produced on a more lavish scale than anything he has ever attempted in the past. He will, however, continue to produce only pictures which are fashioned for aggressive showmanship. His pictures will be made for exploitation." — J. I. Schnitzel Discussing Emory Johnson's new FBO contract) Emory agreed to make eight attractions for FBO, including the four he had completed already. FBO agreed to invest upwards of 2.5 million dollars (equivalent to $47,241,211 in 2025) in the forthcoming productions. Another part of the signed contract stipulated: "The contract also provides that Emory Johnson's mother, Mrs. Emilie Johnson, shall prepare all of the stories and write all the scripts for the Johnson attractions in addition to assisting her son in filming the productions."

=== 1924 ===
Emilie started the year by writing the story for her fifth FBO film, The Spirit of the USA, about World War I, released in May. She wrote the story and the screenplay, saying Woodrow Wilson inspired it.

Emilie finished the year with her sixth film in this series,Life's Greatest Game, released in October. This story is about America's greatest pastime, baseball. The Black Sox Scandal inspired the movie section regarding throwing a World Series. The rest of the film features crooks, illicit affairs, the spectacular sinking of the Titanic, romance, and a middle-aged father uniting with his long-lost son.

=== 1925 ===
The seventh film in the FBO contract was The Last Edition, released in October. It tells the story of a family's fortunes, bound up in the dramas of a newspaper pressroom. Emilie wrote the script, their only production of the year.

=== 1926 ===
The year started with tragedy. Emilie's grandson was run over by a truck and killed in Los Angeles. Alfred Bernard Johnson was only five years old when he died in March 1926. He was Emilie's second oldest grandson.

In March, Emory and Emilie Johnson released their last picture for FBO, The Non-Stop Flight. It tells the story of a sea captain who returns home from a long voyage and discovers that his wife and child have been kidnapped. He goes mad and becomes a smuggler.

The same year, Emory and Emilie were working on a movie titled Happiness. Work had supposedly started in December 1925. Emory, Emilie, and the cast and crew had sailed for Sweden to film the movie. The fate of the movie remains unknown.

FBO decided to let Emory and Emilie Johnson's contracts expire in April. No reason was published regarding the expirations.

In June, Emory and his mother signed a new eight-picture deal with Universal.

=== 1927 ===
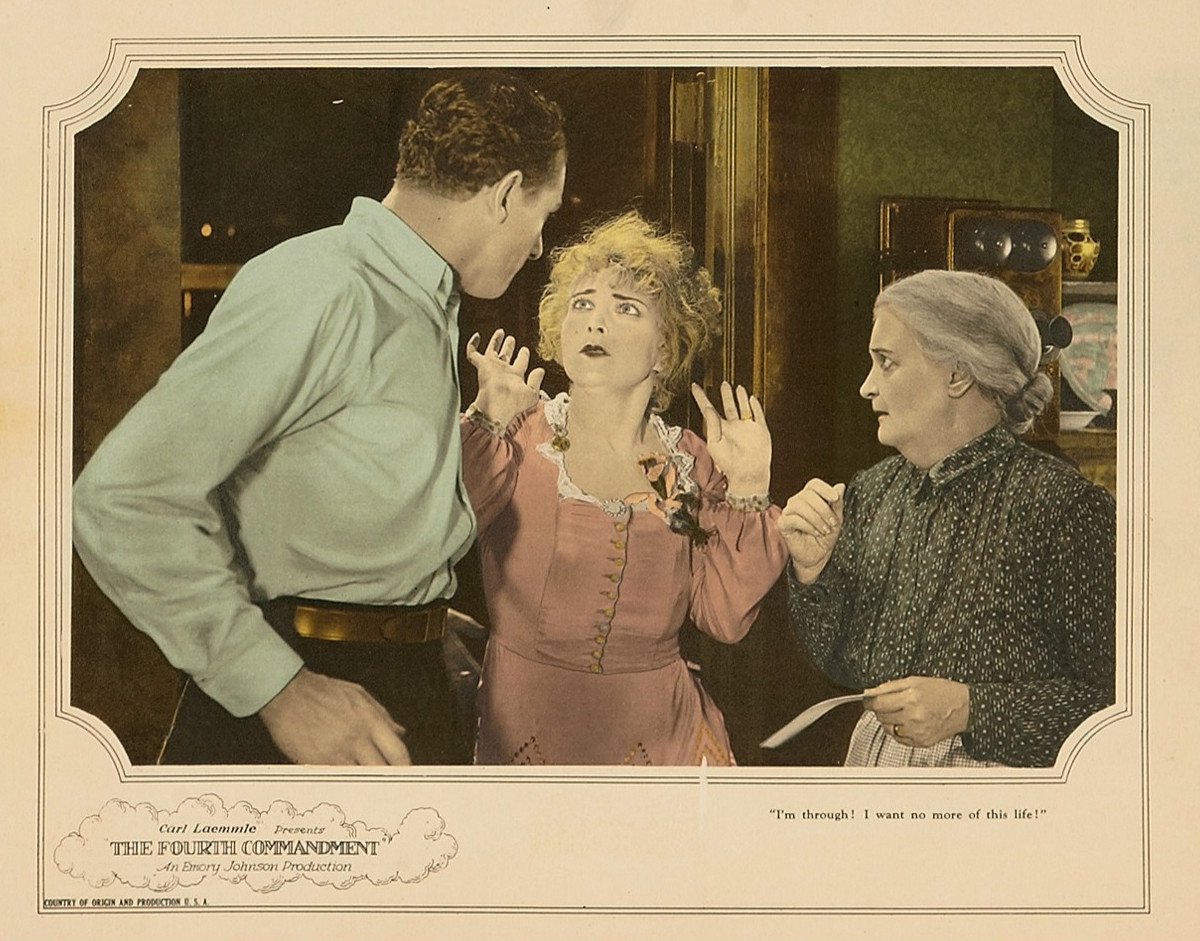
Lobby card

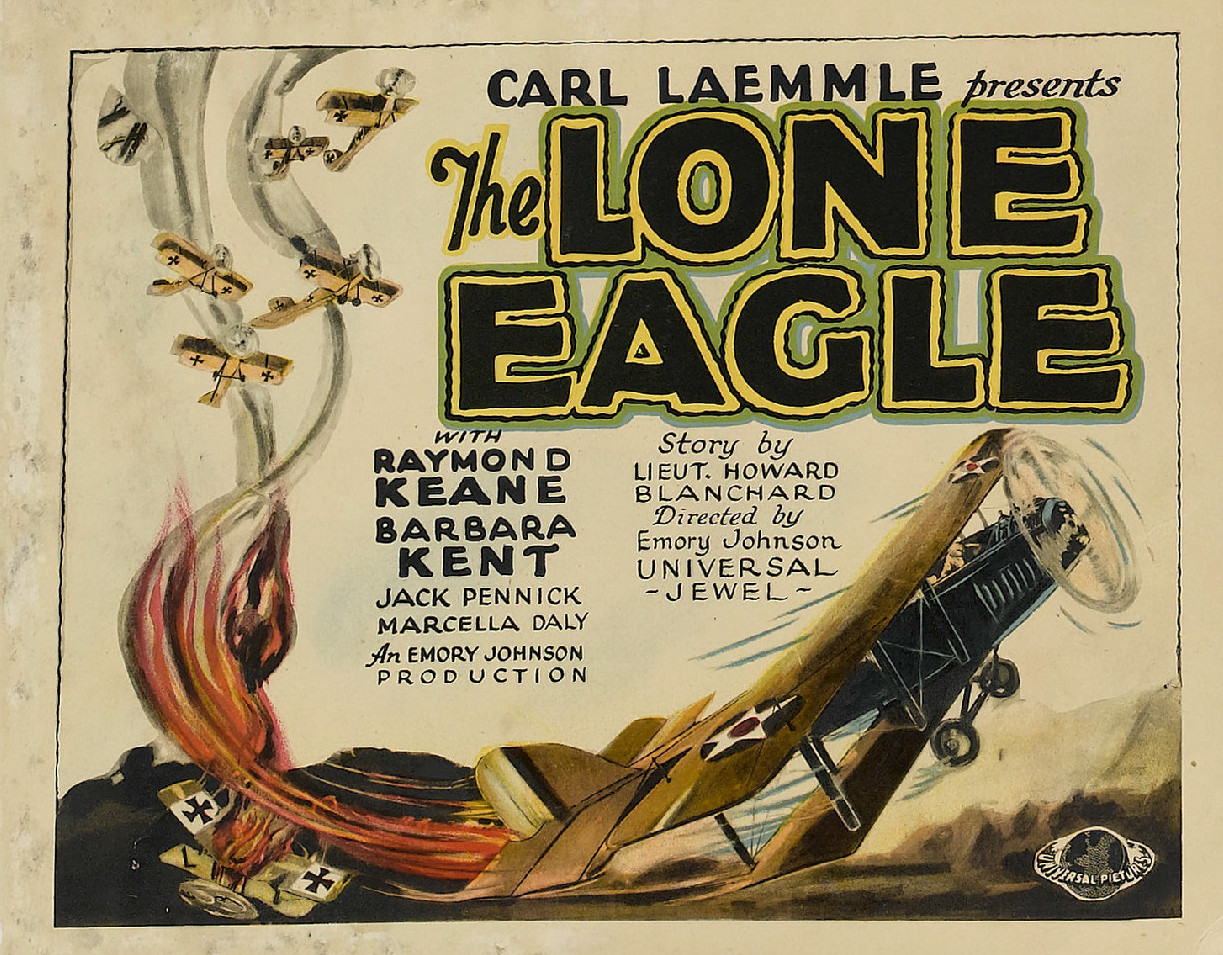
Lobby card

Emilie was now approaching sixty years of age, while Emory was still in his thirties. In March, Universal released the Fourth Commandment, written by Emilie. It is the tale of family drama, focusing on the strains and rivalries between wives and mothers-in-law.

In September, Emilie "assisted" in the writing of The Lone Eagle, a World War I aviation film, according to the credits.

=== 1928 ===
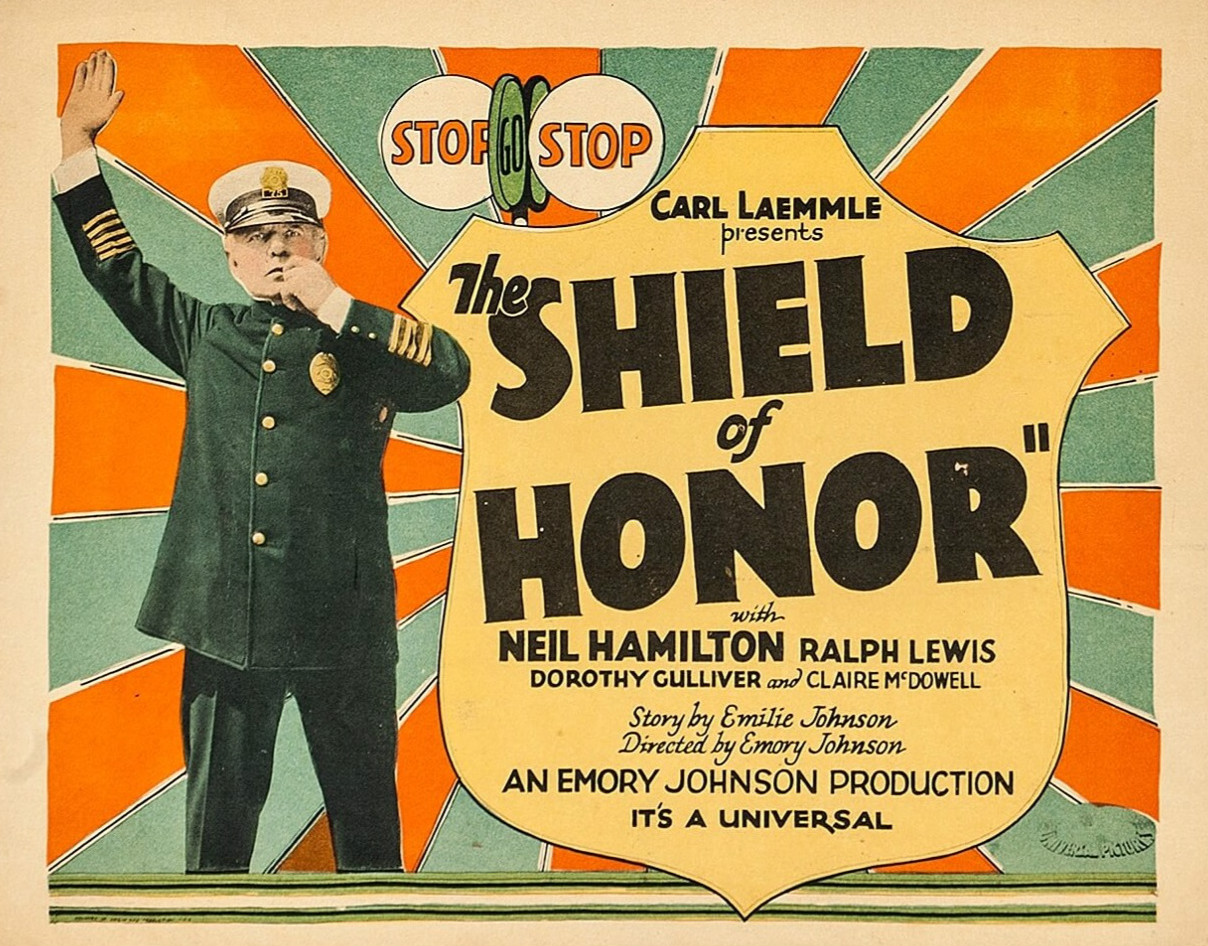
Lobby card

In February, Universal released The Shield of Honor, written by Emilie. The film is a police tale with elements of aviation drama, jewel thieves, and a love story.

After completing three moderately successful movies for Universal, the Johnson team jumped ship, reneged on their eight-picture contract, and signed with another company. Emory and his mother negotiated a new contract with Poverty Row studio Tiffany-Stahl Productions.

Emory spent significant portions of 1929 trying to reconcile with Ella Hall and repair their marriage. Because they had lost Alfred Bernard in 1926, Emory and Ella decided to have one last child. Emilie's granddaughter Diana Marie (Dinie) was born in October 1929.

=== 1930–1932 ===
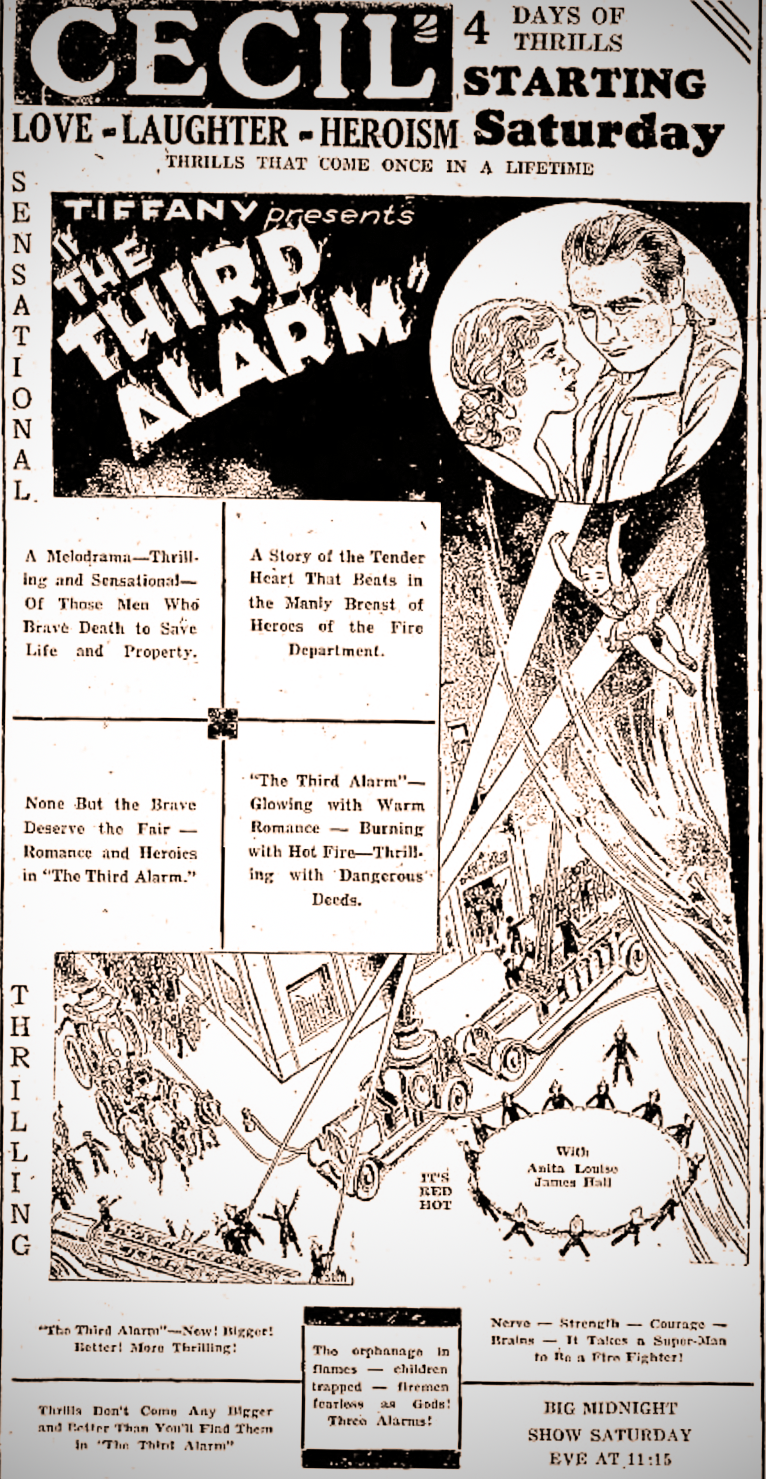
Newspaper ad

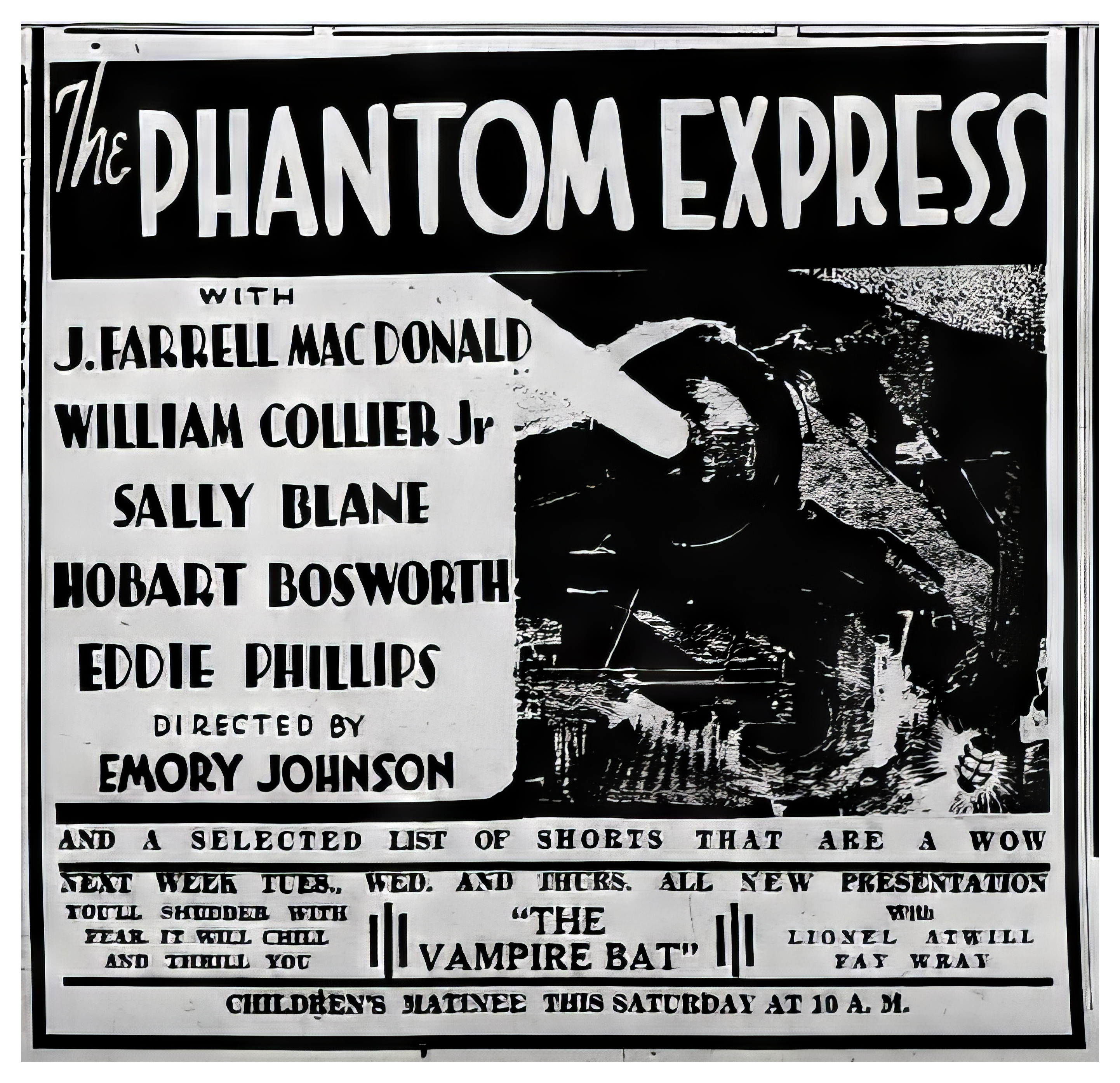
Newspaper ad

In November 1930, Emory Johnson released his first Tiffany-Stahl Productions contract production, The Third Alarm. This film would become his first talkie. Although the name of this film was the same as the 1922 version, the similarity ended there.

This remake is a family drama about a young girl and her younger brother who are orphaned when their father is killed in a fire. A hero emerges who tries to prevent the children from going to an orphan asylum. A fire starts at the orphanage, and the children must be saved. After saving them, the hero realizes he is in love with one of the orphans. They get married and live together with her brother.

Emilie's original story is the basis for this film, but the similarity only extends to both stories being about firefighters. The screenwriting duties of this version of The Third Alarm were assigned to another T-S writer, Frances Hyland.

A significant news item appeared on Page 4 of the September 4, 1930, edition of Variety Magazine.

"Emory Johnson, engaged by Tiffany to direct "The Third Alarm" on the strength of his silent of the same title for FBO, has been off the picture since the first day's shooting. Martin Cohn, the editorial supervisor at Tiff, is finishing it, although direction credit will go to Johnson, beside a piece of the picture. Johnson objected to the supervision."

The Third Alarm was Emory Johnson's last film for Tiffany.

He signed a new contract with another Poverty Row studio—Majestic Pictures. In August 1932, Emory released his last film, Majestic Pictures' The Phantom Express, with Emilie receiving a story credit. Emory tried to recreate the success of his previous railroad film, . Unlike his first railroad film, The West~Bound Limited, which was silent, The Phantom Express was a talkie. It told the story of a train that derails under mysterious circumstances, and the ensuing investigation.

This was the final curtain call for Emory's independent directing years and Emile's collaborative writing. Emory was contracted to make one last picture for Majestic, Air Patrol, but the project never came to fruition.

== Final chapter ==
In 1930, Emile Johnson turned 63 years old. Two years later, Emory Johnson filed for bankruptcy. Emilie and Emory sold the house on Franklin Avenue where Emory, his mother, Ella Hall, and all the kids had lived. Emory and his mother moved to a new house on Killion Street sometime after 1930. Emory became a portrait photographer in Los Angeles and eventually relocated to San Mateo, California. He died in 1961.

After 1932, Emilie's movie-writing career was over. This last decade of her life was unremarkable. It closed with her death on September 23, 1941, at 74, in Los Angeles, California.

== Family ==
Emilie Johnson was married to her only husband, Alfred, and had one son, Emory Johnson. She had four grandchildren after her son married Ella Hall:

1. Walter Emory Jr., born in 1919; changed his name to Richard Emory and had an acting career in B movies
2. Alfred Bernard, born in 1920; died in 1925
3. Ellen Joanna, born in 1923; changed her name to Ellen Hall and had an acting career in B movies
4. Diana Marie, born in 1929; became a housewife

== Themes ==
Emilie Johnson wrote stories about law enforcement officers, firefighters, mail carriers, railroad engineers, patriots, baseball players, and newspaper press operators. Her son brought them to the screen in epic melodramas. The Johnson team felt their human-interest stories would be relatable on the silver screen.

Emory had also earned the title of "King of Exploitation". The moniker was good for advertising but not truly earned. The exploitation angle was not the brainchild of the Johnsons. FBO's Nat Rothstein hatched the strategy for all the Johnson movies. An example can be seen at In the Name of the Law – Advertising.

== Quotes ==
"Throughout my work, I have followed one rule which I think is successful. It is the combining of emotion with humor – making a laugh follow a scene of pathos."

— Emilie Johnson, 1922,

"When creating The Third Alarm, I took every possible opportunity to visit the engine houses of the fire department, watching the actions of the firemen and observing the procedure in answering an alarm. Emory (Johnson) is always with me on these occasions, and we are in consultation daily regarding angles of the story that present themselves as a result of our observations. Together we attend the fire chief's convention in San Francisco."

— Emilie Johnson, 1923 "The Third Alarm" newspaper article,

"To secure atmosphere for my railroad story, Westbound Limited, Emory and I have ridden in the engine cab, in the caboose, on the cowcatcher, and almost every place on the train that is an unusual one for a layman to occupy. We have visited the railroad yards, roundhouses, dispatchers' offices and have climbed into switch towers. We feel that this procedure enables us to work out the story's details more intelligently."

— Emilie Johnson, 1923 Visits Railroad Shops in Search of Local Color,

"The greatest appeal in pictures is not in extravagant spectacles, historical pageants, or adaptations of fairy tales. I think the straight-forward, clean, wholesome melodrama will always have the choice corner in the hearts of the American public."

— Emilie Johnson, 1924 Play and Players,

"I would much rather write for the screen than the stage or the publisher."

— Emilie Johnson, 1924 Play and Players,

"For the author, the world is your oyster."

— Emilie Johnson, 1924 Play and Players,

== Film credits ==
A compilation of known on-screen and off-screen film credits

◆ Movie writing credits for Emilie Johnson ◆
Year	Film	Producer	Distributor	Credits *	Notes
1921	Blind Hearts	Hobart Bosworth	Associated Producers	Story	
1921	The Sea Lion	Hobart Bosworth	Associated Producers	Story	
1922	In the Name of the Law	Emory Johnson	Film Booking Offices of America	Story, Screenplay	
1922	The Third Alarm	Emory Johnson	Film Booking Offices of America	Story	
1923	The West~Bound Limited	Emory Johnson	Film Booking Offices of America	Story, Screenplay	
1923	The Mailman	Emory Johnson	Film Booking Offices of America	Story, Screenplay	
1924	The Spirit of the USA	Emory Johnson	Film Booking Offices of America	Story, Screenplay	
1924	Life's Greatest Game	Emory Johnson	Film Booking Offices of America	Story	
1925	The Last Edition	Emory Johnson	Film Booking Offices of America	Story, Screenplay	
1925	The Non-Stop Flight	Emory Johnson	Film Booking Offices of America	Story, Screenplay	
1927	The Lone Eagle	Universal Pictures	Universal Pictures	Film adaptation	
1927	The Shield of Honor	Universal Pictures	Universal Pictures	Story	
1927	Fourth Commandment	Universal Pictures	Universal Pictures	Story	
1930	The Third Alarm	Tiffany Productions	Tiffany Productions	Story	
1932	The Phantom Express	Majestic Pictures	Majestic Pictures	Story	
* Based on WGA screenwriting credit system
