= The Sea Lion =

1921 silent film by Rowland V. Lee

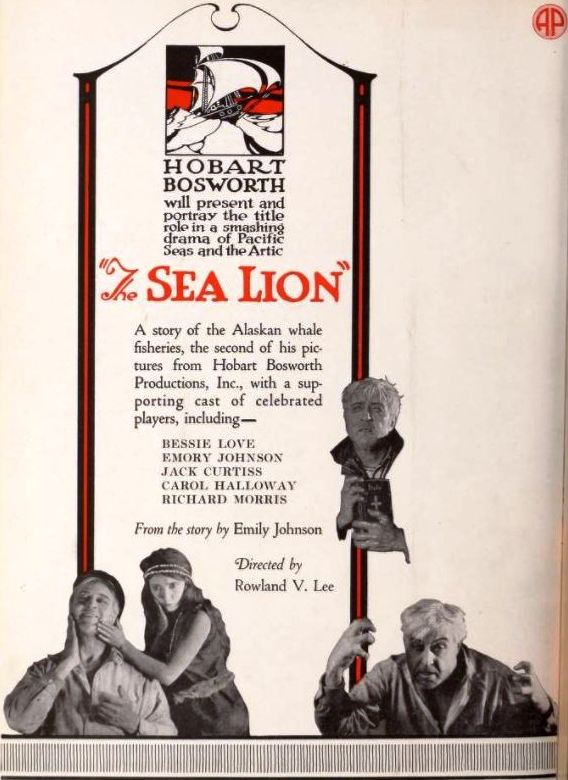
- Advertisement
- Directed by: Rowland V. Lee
- Written by: Emilie Johnson (story); Joseph F. Poland (scenario)
- Produced by: Hobart Bosworth (producer)
- Starring: Hobart Bosworth; Bessie Love; Emory Johnson
- Cinematography: G.O. Post; J.O. Taylor
- Production company: Associated Producers Incorporated
- Distributed by: Associated Producers Incorporated
- Release date: December 5, 1921 (U.S.)
- Running time: 63 minutes (five reels of 4,367 feet)
- Country: United States
- Language: Silent (English intertitles)

The Sea Lion is a 1921 American silent adventure film directed by Rowland V. Lee, and starring Hobart Bosworth, Bessie Love, and Emory Johnson. It was produced and distributed by Associated Producers Incorporated. The team who worked on this film had previously made Lee's Blind Hearts (1921).

The film has been preserved in the collections of the Library of Congress, the UCLA Film and Television Archive and the Pacific Film Archive. It is also in the public domain.

== Plot ==
The Sea Lion (1921) in full

Captain John Nelson and his crew hunt whales on the high seas. The captain is an angry man, having never recovered from his wife's leaving him for another man 20 years prior. When the ship comes to port, Tom, a young man, joins the crew as a lookout. He is distraught as well, having been jilted by his fiancée.

Back on the seas, the ship's inexperienced crew mistakes the water supply for a leak and pumps it overboard. The captain rations the remaining water and stores it in his quarters. The crew mutinies.

From the crow's nest, Tom spots a nearby island and comes down to tell the captain while the crew is asleep. The captain makes Tom the first mate, and they steer the ship to the nearby island. The island is inhabited by two survivors of an earlier shipwreck, one of whom is a beautiful young Blossom. The survivors are brought back to the ship, where the captain resists letting them board. The survivors promise to work on the ship, and he reluctantly agrees to let them travel.

Blossom learns that the captain's family name is Nelson, and says that her mother had the same name. The captain realizes that Blossom is his wife's daughter but assumes Blossom's father is someone else. Blossom tells him that she never knew her father. During a storm at sea, the captain finds Blossom's Bible, which contains a note from her mother saying that she loved him all along. The captain realizes that Blossom is his daughter, and they are reconciled. Blossom and Tom fall in love.

== Cast ==
- Hobart Bosworth as John Nelson, the Sea Lion
- Bessie Love as Blossom Nelson
- Emory Johnson as Tom Walton
- Richard Morris as Uncle Billy
- Charles Clary as Nathan Walton
- Carol Holloway as Dolly May
- Florence Carpenter as Florence
- Jack Curtis as Bentley
- J. Gordon Russell as Simmons

== Production ==
Scenes were filmed aboard the Fox, which was anchored off Balboa in Orange County.
