= Blind Hearts =

1921 film by Rowland V. Lee

Broken Hearts
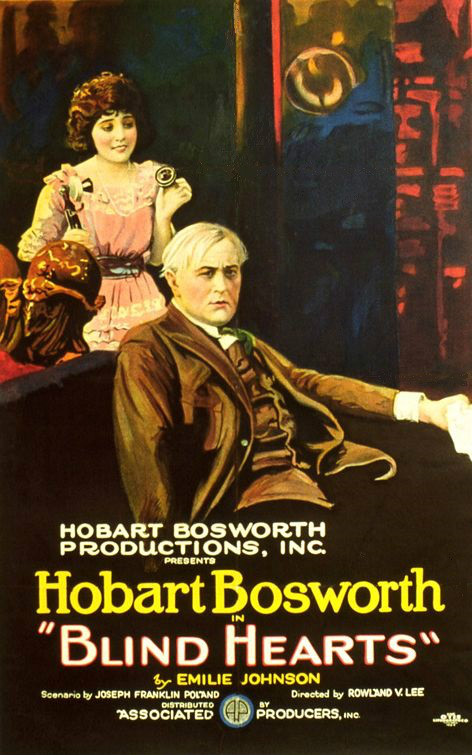
- Film poster
- Directed by: Rowland V. Lee
- Written by: Emilie Johnson (story); Joseph F. Poland (writer)
- Produced by: Hobart Bosworth
- Starring: Hobart Bosworth; Madge Bellamy; Raymond McKee
- Cinematography: J.O. Taylor
- Distributed by: Associated Producers
- Release date: October 3, 1921 (U.S.)
- Running time: 6 reels
- Country: United States
- Language: Silent (English intertitles)

Blind Hearts is a 1921 American silent drama film produced by Hobart Bosworth who stars along with Madge Bellamy and Raymond McKee. This film was made prior to Bosworth's next film The Sea Lion, a film now in Public Domain and out on DVD. Blind Hearts survives in a copy in the Library of Congress.

== Cast ==
- Hobart Bosworth as Lars Larson
- Wade Boteler as John Thomas
- Irene Blackwell as Mrs. Thomas
- Collette Forbes as Hilda Larson
- Madge Bellamy as Julia Larson
- Raymond McKee as Paul Thomas
- William Conklin as James Curdy
- Lule Warrenton as Rita
- Henry Hebert as James Bradley
