= The Lone Eagle =

1927 film directed by Emory Johnson

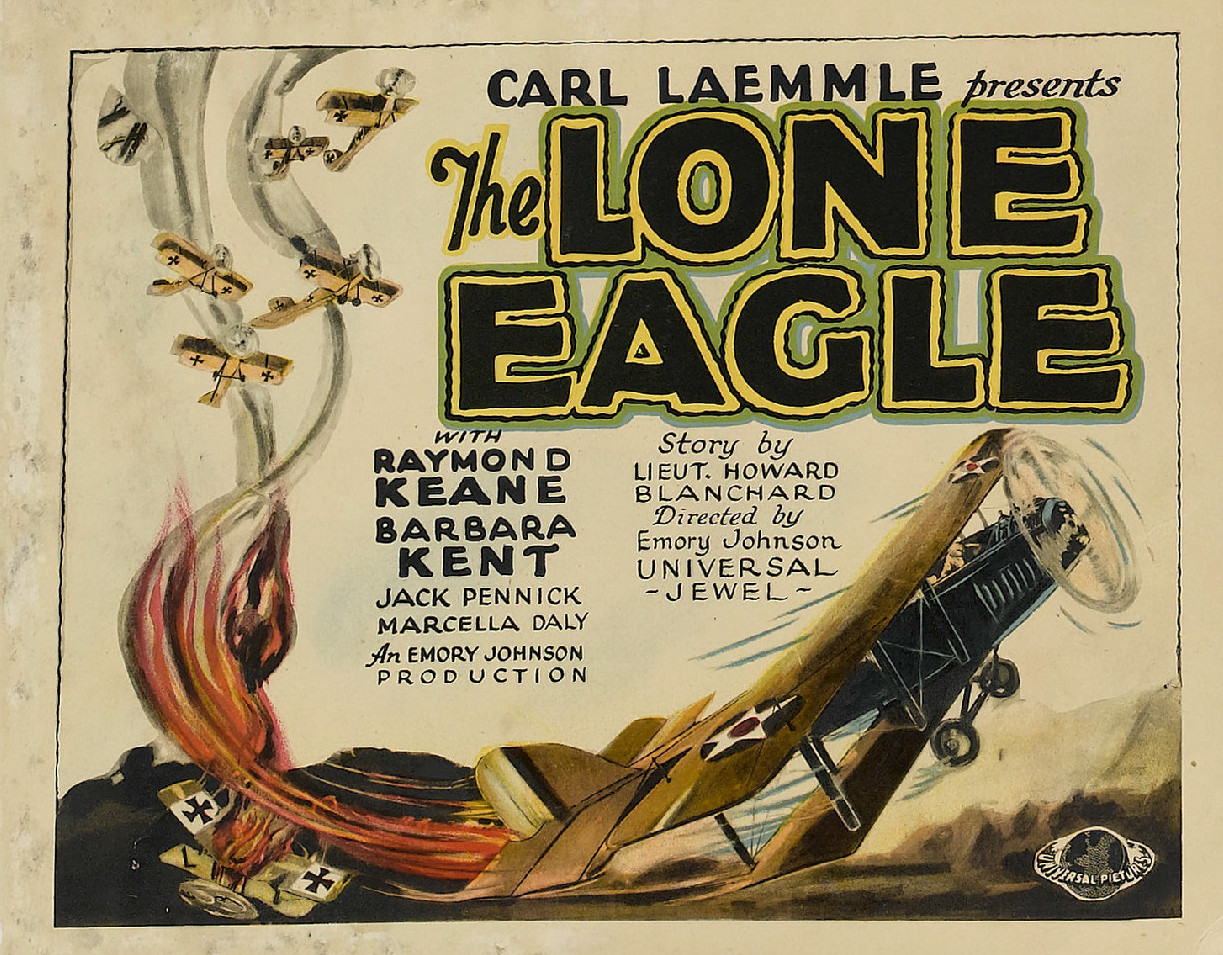
- Theater lobby card
- Directed by: Emory Johnson
- Written by: Emilie Johnson (scenario); John B. Clymer (scenario); Tom Reed (intertitles)
- Story by: Howard Blanchard
- Produced by: Carl Laemmle
- Starring: Raymond Keane; Barbara Kent; Nigel Barrie
- Cinematography: Arthur L. Todd
- Production company: Universal Pictures
- Distributed by: Universal Pictures
- Release date: August 18, 1927
- Running time: 60 minutes, 6 reels,
- Country: United States
- Language: Silent (English intertitles)

The Lone Eagle is a 1927 American silent melodrama directed by Emory Johnson, based on the story by Emilie Johnson, and starring Raymond Keane, Barbara Kent and Nigel Barrie. It was released by Universal Pictures on September 18, 1927.

== Plot ==
During World War I, American pilot Lieutenant William (Billy) Holmes (Raymond Keane) accepts an assignment with the Royal Flying Corps. The unit location is on the Western Front and has seen plenty of action. During Billy's first air battle, he is accused of cowardice.

He meets an attractive French woman named Mimi (Barbara Kent). They start to fall in love, but the cowardice accusation continues to dog Billy. Mimi stirs Billy's emotions, and he becomes determined to prove his mettle in battle.

The unit receives its next flying mission. The group takes to the sky and encounters a squadron of German aircraft. American ace Red McGibbons (Donald Stuart) is one of Billy's best friends. During the dogfight, Red manages to shoot down a German plane, but is also killed.

The pilot of the downed German aircraft turns out to be the brother of the leader of the German squadron. Lebrun (Cuyler Supplee), the squadron leader, is the top German ace of the squadron. He is determined to avenge his brother's death. He challenges the Royal Flying Corps to an aerial fight.

Still thinking of his best friend, Billy accepts the challenge from LeBrun. Mimi tries to dissuade him, but fails. He jumps in the cockpit of his Sopwith Camel, takes off in pursuit of Lebrun. An epic air duel breaks out, and Lebrun shoots down Billy's aircraft. Billy survives, then commandeers another aircraft from his friend Sven Linder (Jack Pennick). He returns to the air and shoots the German ace down.

Billy is a hero and soon the Allies and the Germans sign the Armistice. With the war over, Billy returns to the United States along with his new bride – Mimi.

== Cast ==
- Raymond Keane as Lieutenant William Holmes
- Barbara Kent as Mimi
- Nigel Barrie as Captain Richardson
- Jack Pennick as Sven Linder
- Oskar Marion as Captain W. Buehl
- Wilson Benge as Truck Driver
- Donald Stuart as Red McGibbons
- Cuyler Supplee as Lebrun
- Frank Camphill as Lieutenant at Desk
- Marcella Daly as Nannette
- Eugene Pouyet as Innkeeper
- Brent Overstreet as Aviator
- Egbert Cook as Aviator

== Production ==
The credits of The Lone Eagle claim that Emilie Johnson only "assisted" in the screenwriting.

Principal photography took place on location at a small airport near San Diego, California. The French village was built on 2 acres of the Universal back lot.

== Reception ==
Aviation film historian James Farmer in Celluloid Wings: The Impact of Movies on Aviation (1984) noted, despite the film's tagline:

Greatest of all airplane stories taken from the great war. . .The Lone Eagle was a cheaply produced World War I air drama.

== Preservation ==
According to the Library of Congress website, this film has the status of 'No holdings located in archives; thus, it is presumed all copies of this film are lost'.

== Gallery ==
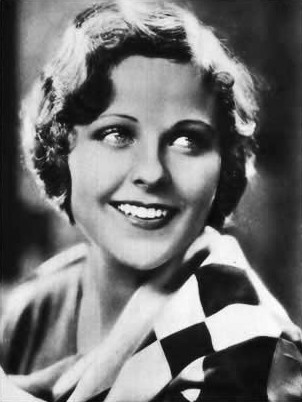
Barbara Kent
Mimi

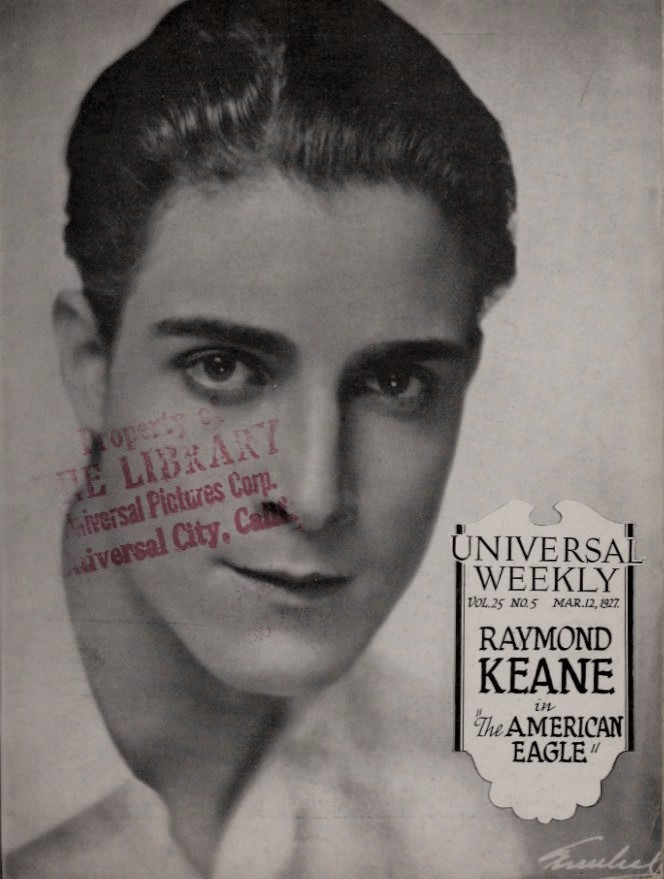
Raymond Keane
Lt William Holmes

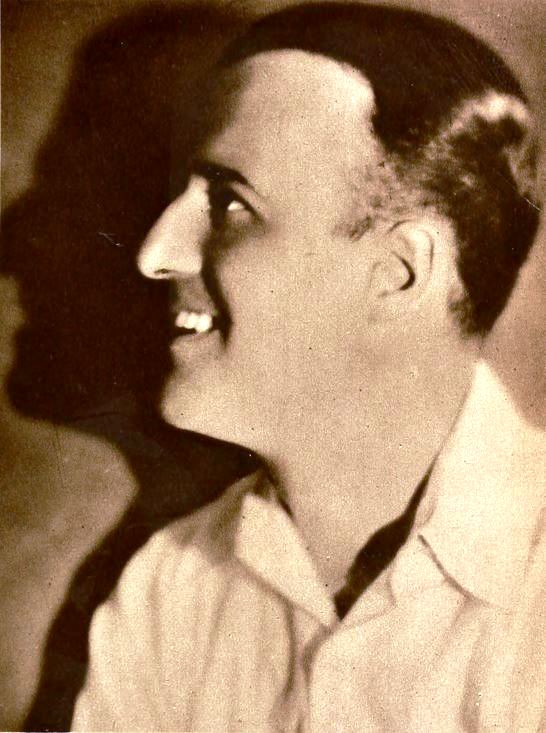
Nigel Barrie
Captain Richardson

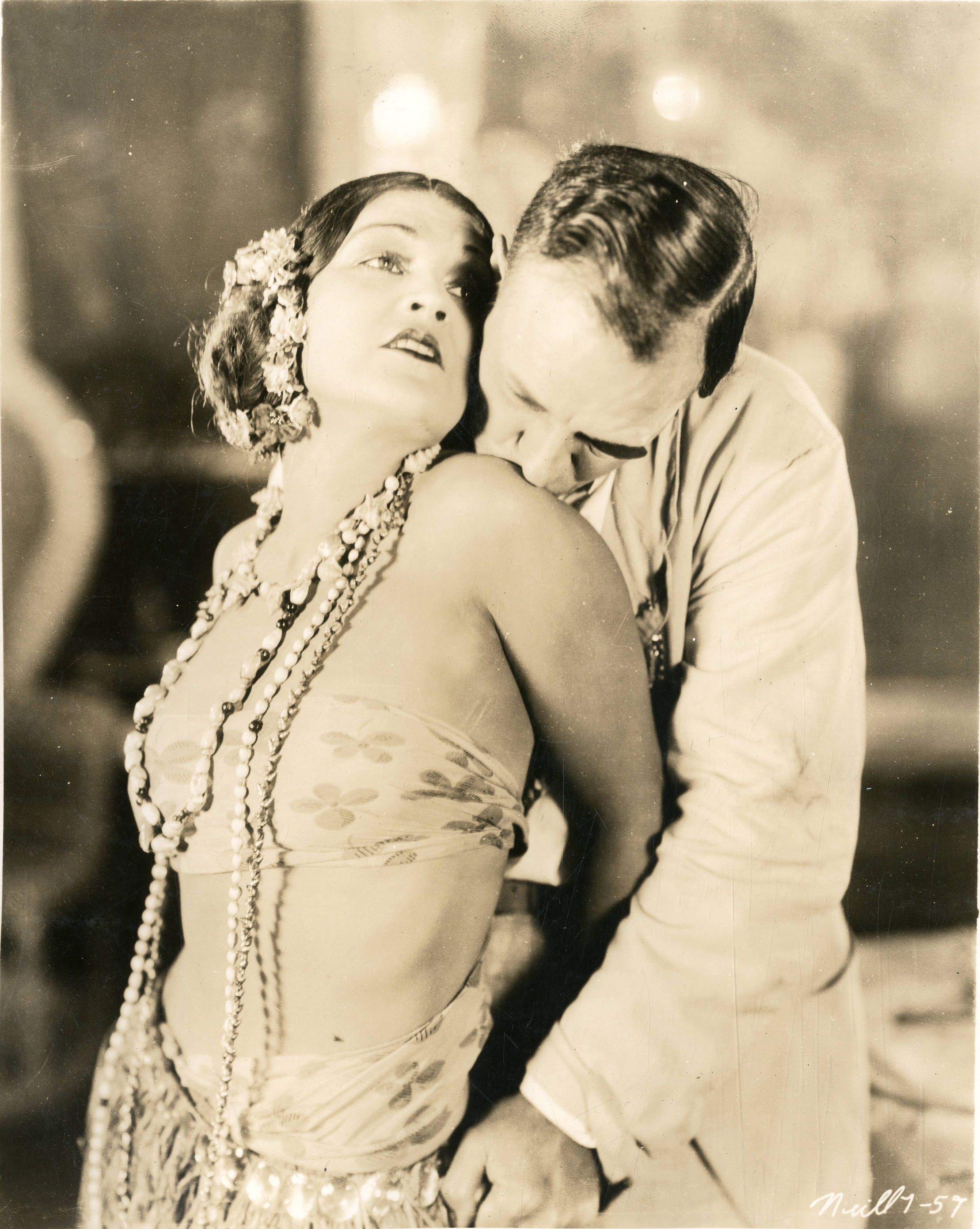
Marcella Daly
Nannette

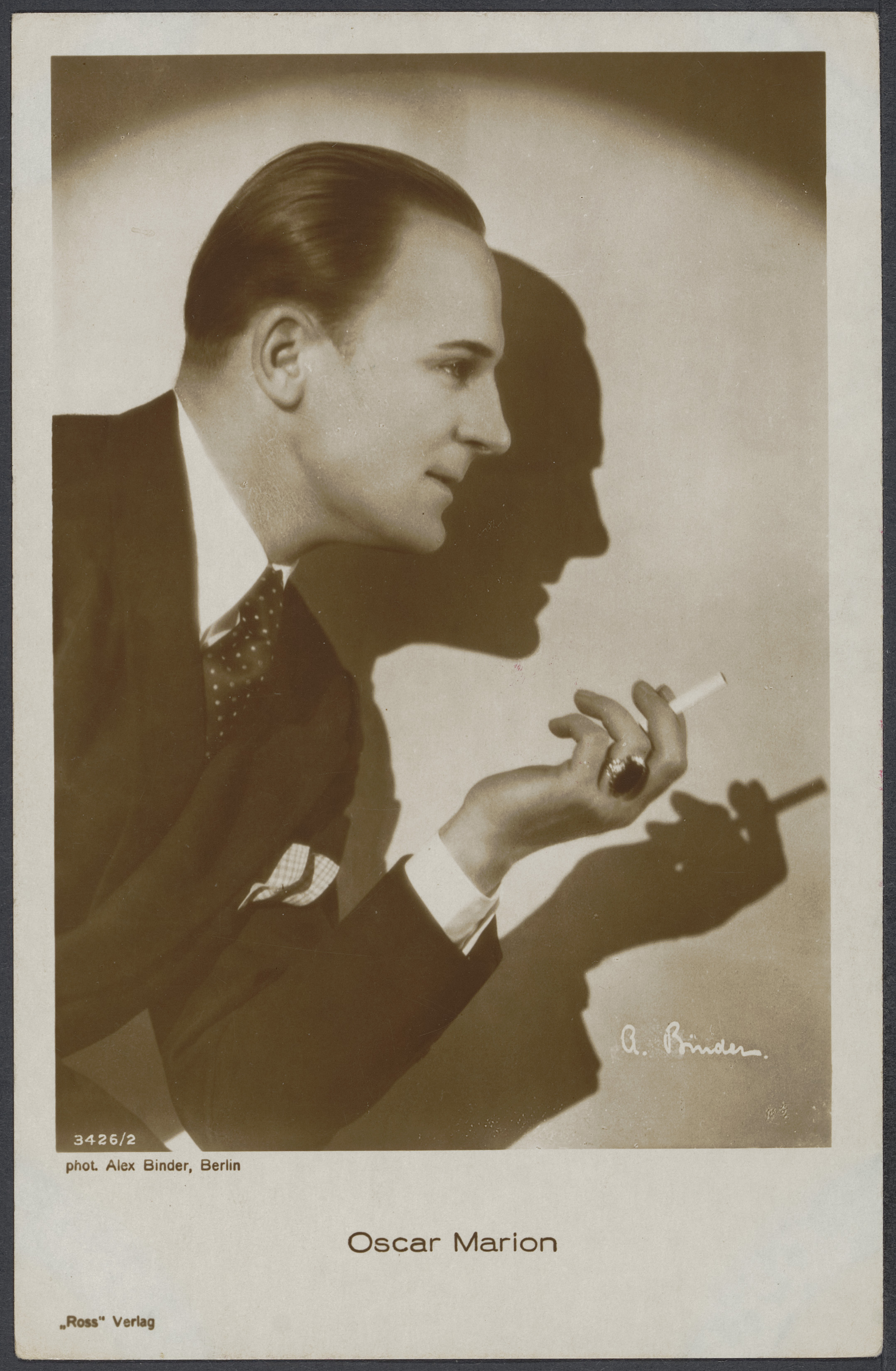
Oskar Marion
Captain W.Buehl

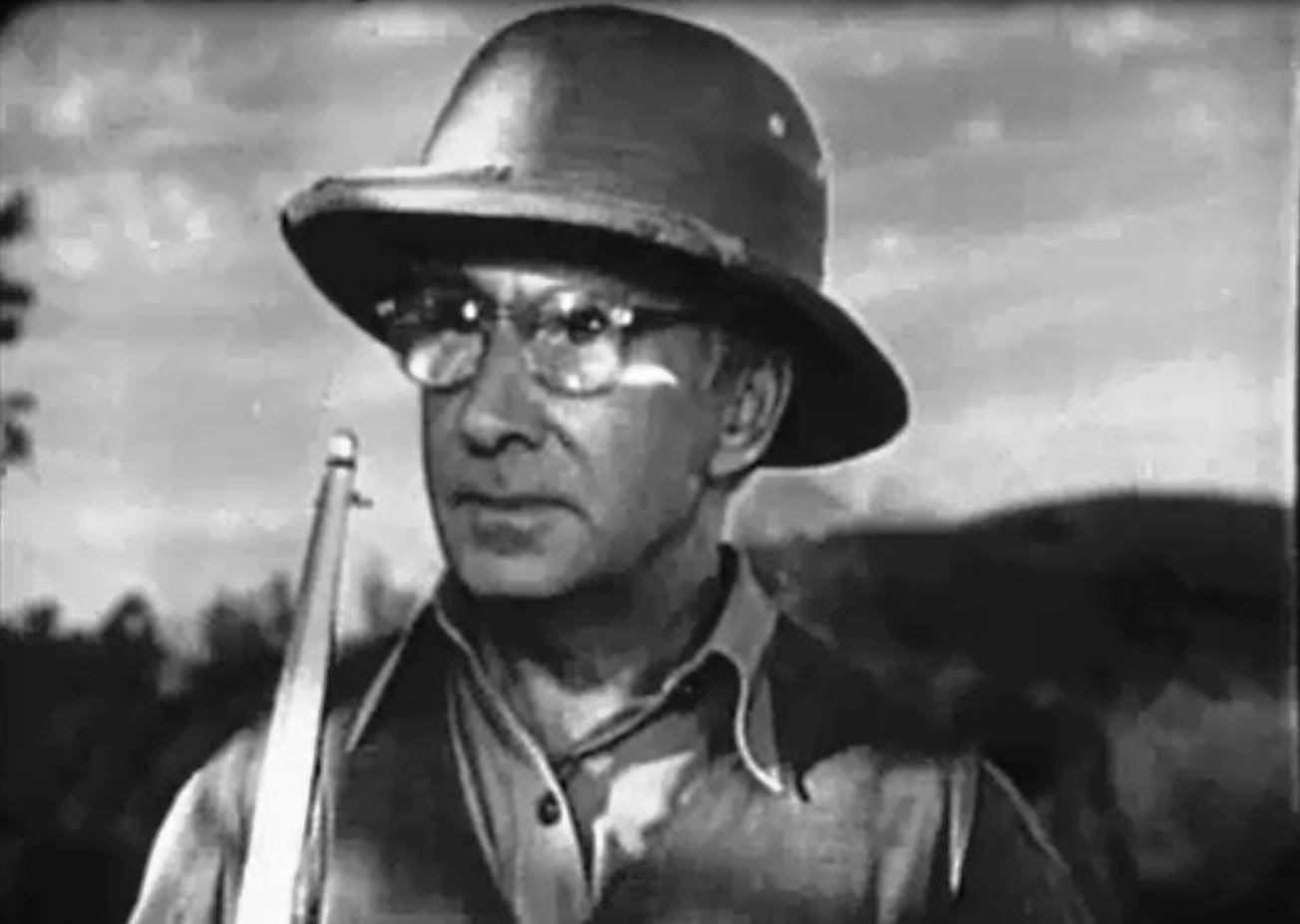
Wilson Benge
Truckdriver
