= The Third Alarm (1930 film) =

1930 film

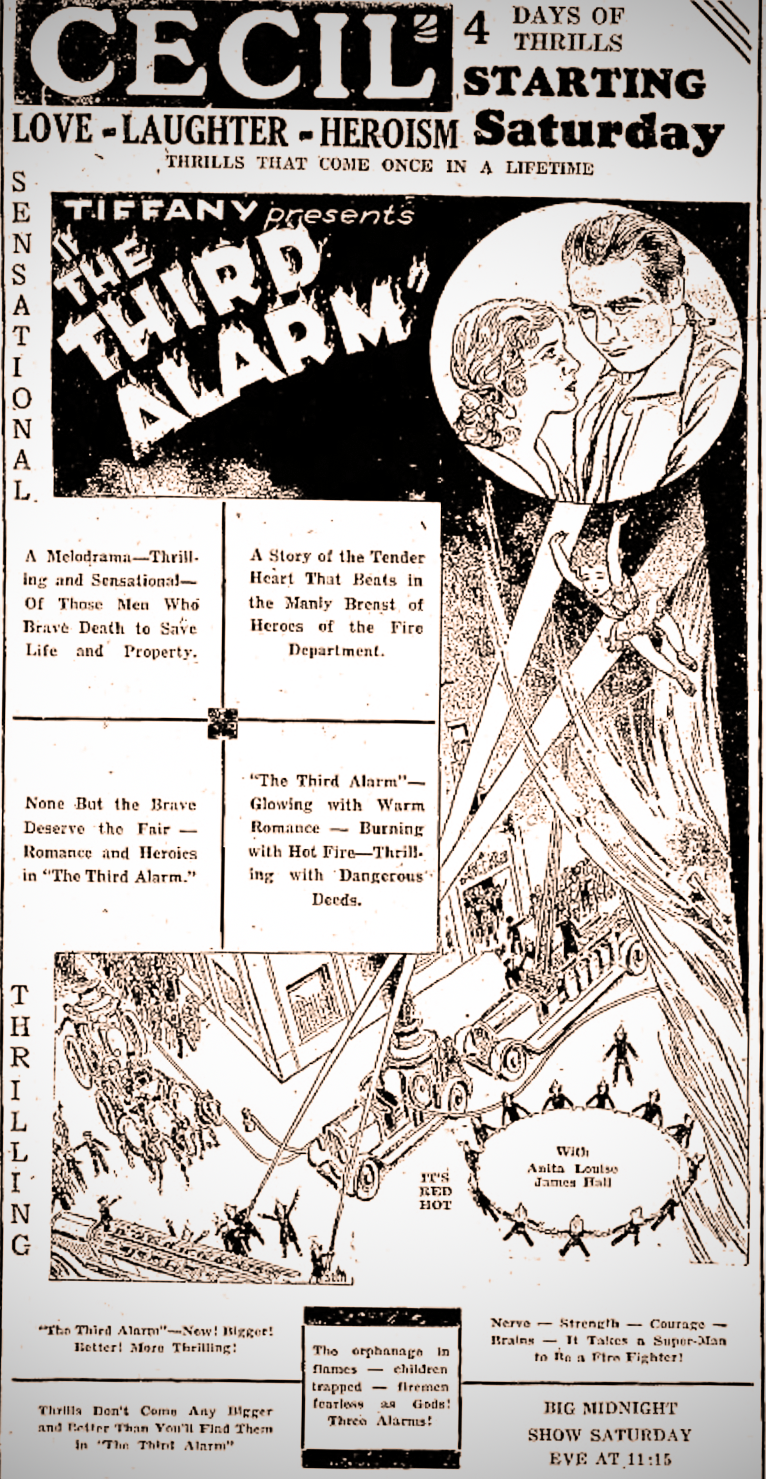
- Newspaper ad for film
- Directed by: Emory Johnson
- Written by: Emilie Johnson story; Frances Hyland scenario & dialogue; Jack Natteford scenario & dialogue
- Produced by: Tiffany-Stahl Productions
- Starring: Anita Louise; James Hall
- Cinematography: Max Dupont
- Distributed by: Tiffany-Stahl Productions
- Release date: November 30, 1930
- Running time: 7 reels 79 minutes
- Country: United States
- Language: English

The Third Alarm is a 1930 American pre-Code drama film directed by Emory Johnson. The film is based on the original story by Emilie Johnson and is set in San Francisco, California. The photoplay stars Anita Louise, James Hall, and Jean Hersholt. The movie was released on November 30, 1930, by Tiffany-Stahl Productions

== Plot ==
This story unfolds by introducing the audience to the fireman working at Engine House No.8. One fireman is veteran Frank 'Dad' Morton, played by Jean Hersholt. 'Dad' Morton is a widower. Though alone, he has assumed the responsibility of raising his two motherless children – a girl and her younger brother Jimmy. The children love hanging around the engine house with their dad. The children are especially fond of firemen Dan, played by James Hall and 'Beauty' Johnson, played Paul Hurst.

Suddenly, the fire alarm sounds. All the firemen quickly board their firetrucks and depart to fight the fire. At the scene of the fire, 'Dad' Morton dies while battling the flames. His death leaves his two children orphans. The children are scheduled to go to the local orphanage. Dan and Beauty have an alternate plan for the kids. They offer to adopt the two children. Because they are bachelors, the local authorities reject their proposal. The children are sent to the orphanage until they become of age. Both Dan and Beauty start pursuing another avenue to adopt the kids. Both firemen, while keeping it from each other, decide to get married.

The years pass, and we find Dan has proposed to Neeta, played by Mary Doran. Neeta accepts Dan's marriage proposal. 'Dad' Morton's daughter has now grown into a beautiful young woman. The daughter, played by Anita Louise, still lives at the orphanage. Now, she finds out about Dan's engagement with Neeta. She has always had a secret fondness for Dan. She becomes heartbroken. Neeta senses Milly Morton's fascination with Dan is deeper than plain friendship. Prompted by forces, Dan does not understand; he makes a trip to the orphanage. One thing leads to another; the orphanage matron calls the police. Dan is taken into custody for contributing to the delinquency of minors. Dan pays his bail and is released. Thinking about his actions, Dan starts to understand his true feelings for Milly. Meanwhile, the fire chief suspends Dan from duty.

The scene switches to the orphanage where someone is ironing clothes. They are called away and inadvertently leave the iron directly on the ironing board. It catches fire. The ironing board fire soon builds into a much more massive fire. Soon the orphanage is engulfed in flames. The burning building has turned into a three-alarm fire.

The fire alarm starts ringing at Engine House No 8. The men jump into their firetrucks and head to the orphanage. Dan finds out the orphanage is on fire and, even though he's suspended from duty, heads out to fight back the blaze.

Dan arrives at the scene of the fire. He realizes the children, including 'Dad' kids, cannot escape the burning orphanage. Dan rushes into the blazing inferno saving all of the trapped children. While saving the children, Dan comes to realize he loves Milly Morton. After the blaze is extinguished, Dan tells Milly how he feels. Dan and Milly eventually get engaged. As it turns out, 'Beauty' Johnson also finds love in the end.

== Cast ==
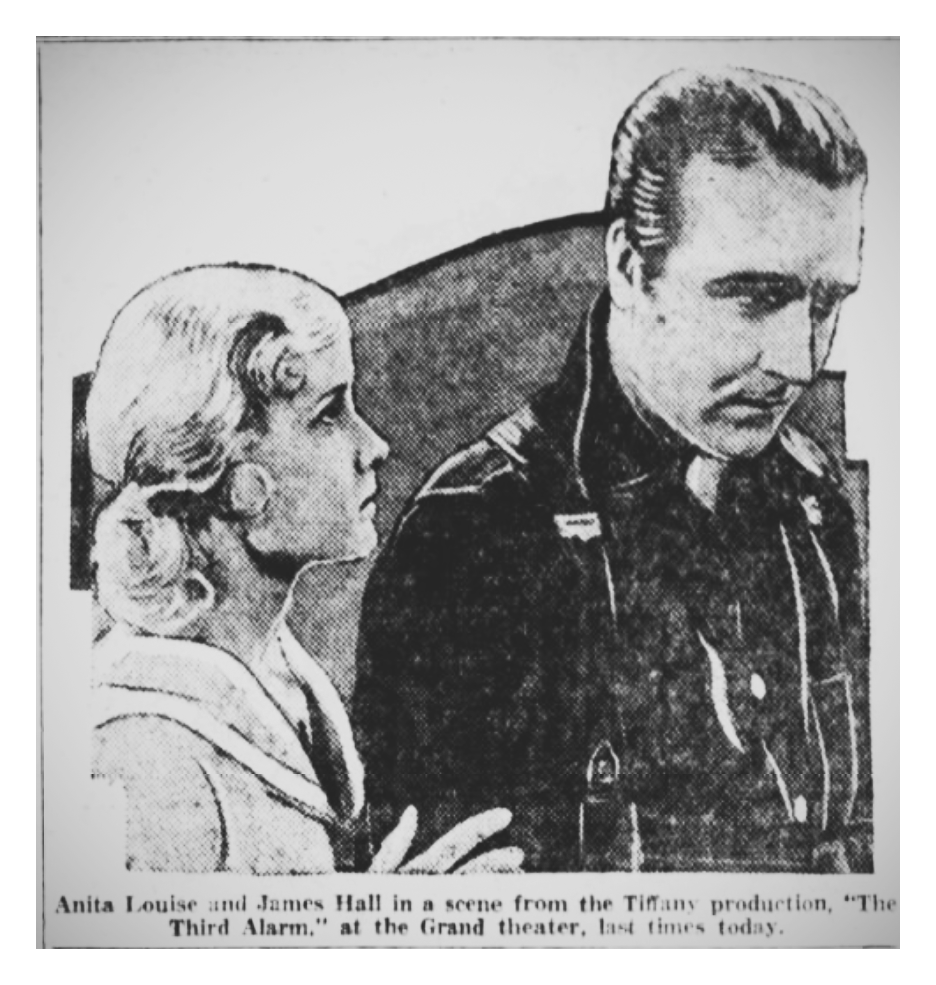

Actor	Role
Anita Louise	Milly Morton
James Hall	Dan
Paul Hurst	'Beauty' Johnson
Jean Hersholt	Frank 'Dad' Morton
Hobart Bosworth	Precinct Fire Captain
Mary Doran	Neeta
Dot Farley	Woman Barber
Nita Martan	Mamie Ziek
Georgie Billings	Jimmy Morton
Walter Perry	Uncle
Aileen Manning	Mrs. Craig - Orphanage Matron
Joseph W. Girard	Pensions Board Commissioner
Franklyn Farnum	Fire Department Captain
Charlotte Merriam	Blonde
Tom London	Fireman Tom

== Production ==
Emilie Johnson's original story, The Third Alarm, is reputed to be the basis for this film. Beyond the same titles, the only similarity these films have in common is - both stories are about firefighters.

The film's director Emory Johnson had filmed the silent version of this film in 1922 - The Third Alarm. The first film was distributed by FBO.

This film would be Emory Johnson's first release under his newly signed contract with Tiffany-Stahl Productions. This film is also Emory Johnson first talkie. This film would become Emory Johnson second to the last movie he directed before he faded from Hollywood.

A minor but quite significant news blurb appeared on Page 4 of the September 4, 1930 edition of Variety Magazine.

Emory Johnson, engaged by Tiffany to direct "The Third Alarm" on the strength of his silent film of the same title for FBO; has been off the picture since the first day's shooting. Martin Cohn, the editorial supervisor at Tiff, is finishing it, although direction credit will go to Johnson, besides a piece of the picture. Johnson objected to the supervision.

Actors Anita Louise and Georgie Billins were "slightly burned" when a smoke pot exploded. The accident occurred with the players were shooting the final scenes of the movie "The Third Alarm."

"The Third Alarm" was the last film Emory Johnson would make for Tiffany-Stahl Productions. Emory would break his contract with Tiffany and sign a new contract with another Poverty Row studio – Majestic Pictures. Note - Tiffany-Stahl would file for bankruptcy in 1932. Copyrights on most (if not all) of Tiffany's films were not renewed, and are now in the public domain.

== Preservation status ==
This film is preserved in the Library of Congress collection.

== Gallery ==
Players
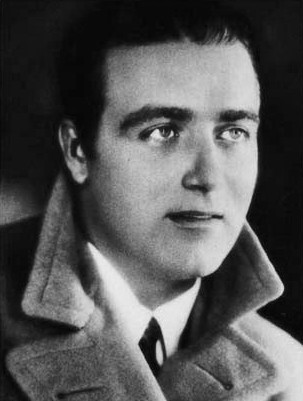
James Hall
Dan

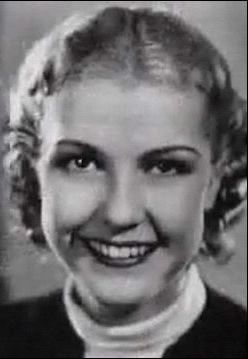
Anita Louise
Milly Morton

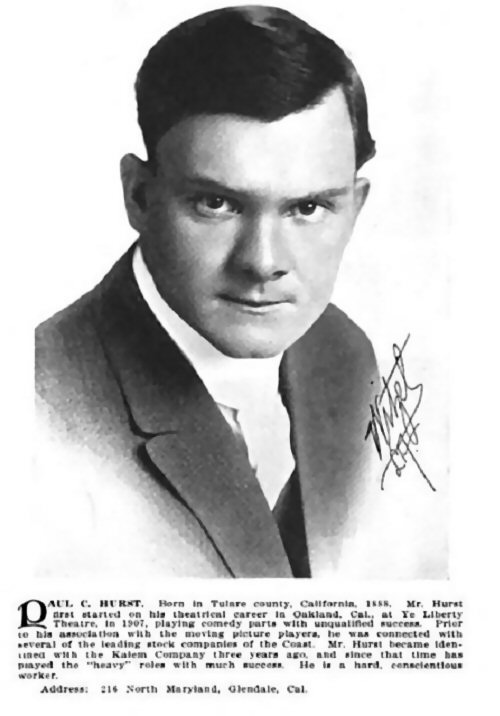
Paul Hurst
'Beauty' Johnson

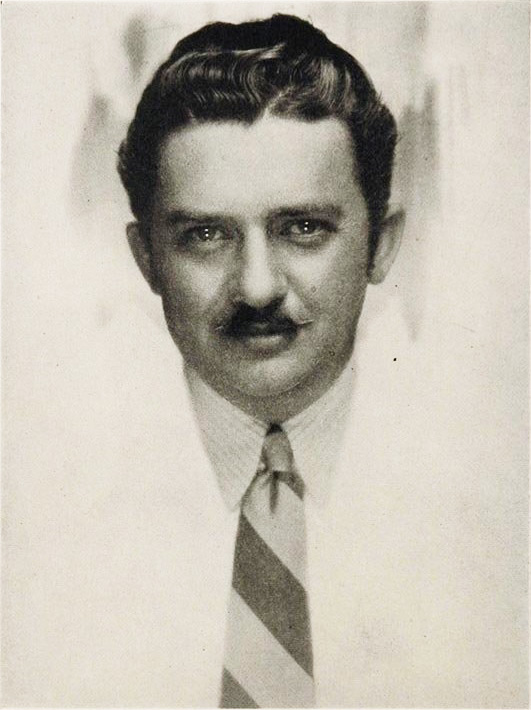
Jean Hersholt
Frank 'Dad' Morton

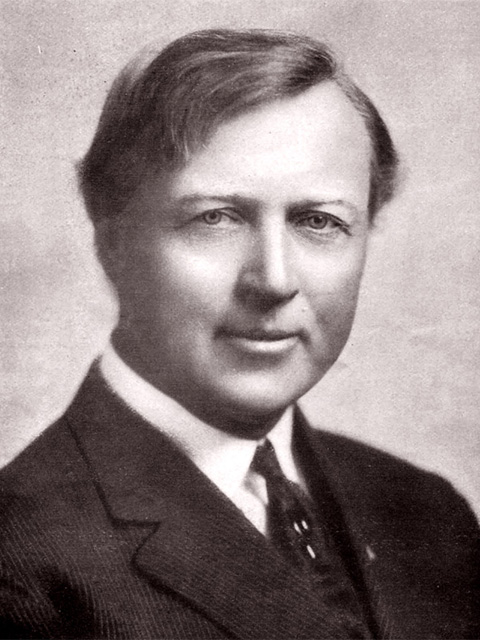
Hobart Bosworth
Precinct Fire Captain

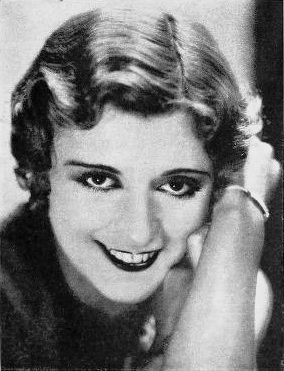
Mary Doran
Neeta

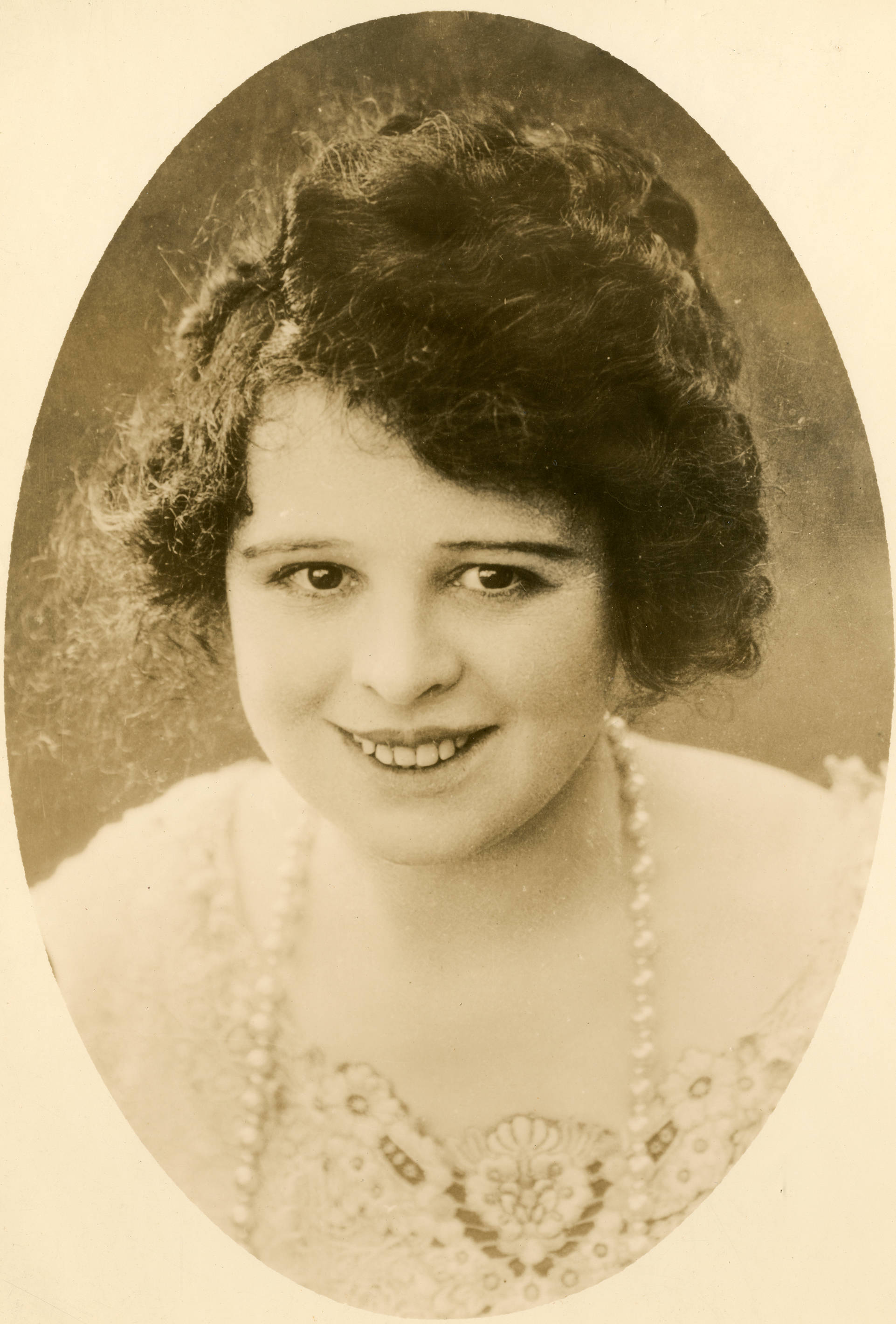
Dot Farley
Woman Barber

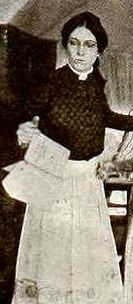
Aileen Manning
Mrs. Craig - Orphanage Matron

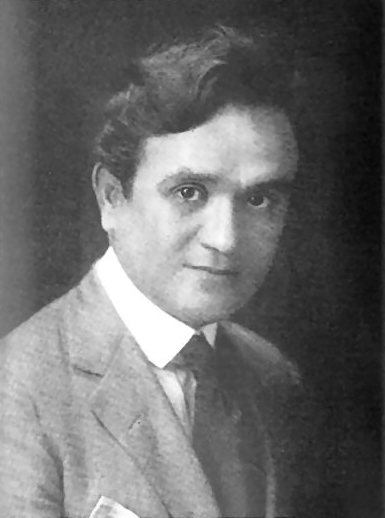
Franklyn Farnum
Fire Department Captain

Joseph W. Girard
Pensions Board Commissioner

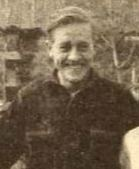
Tom London
Fireman Tom

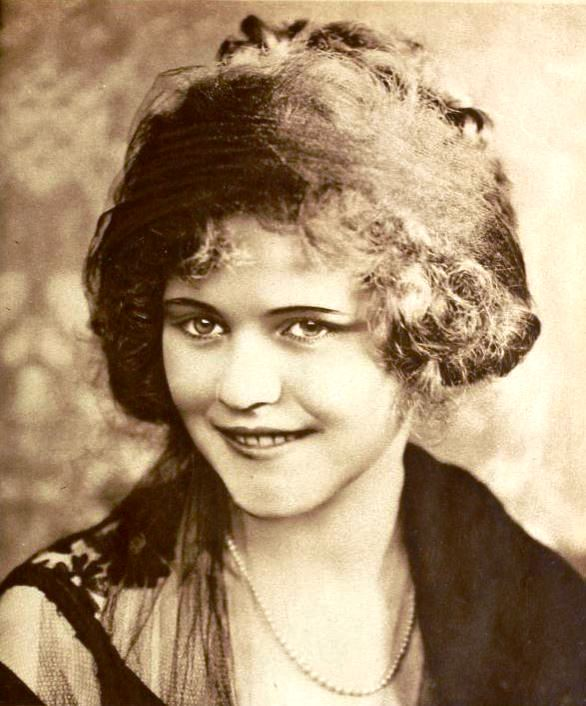
Charlotte Merriam
Blonde

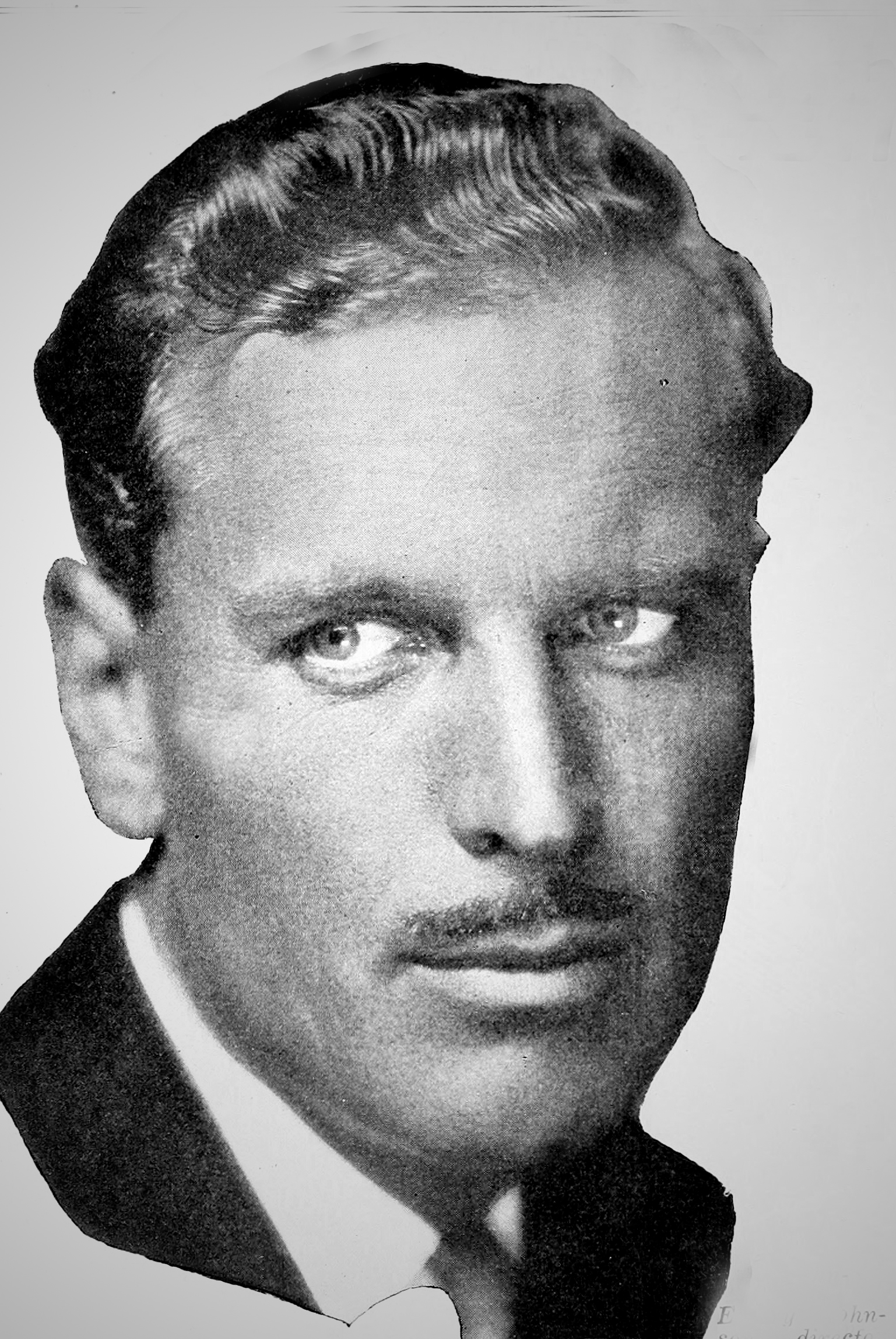
Emory Johnson
Director
