= Always the Woman =

1922 film

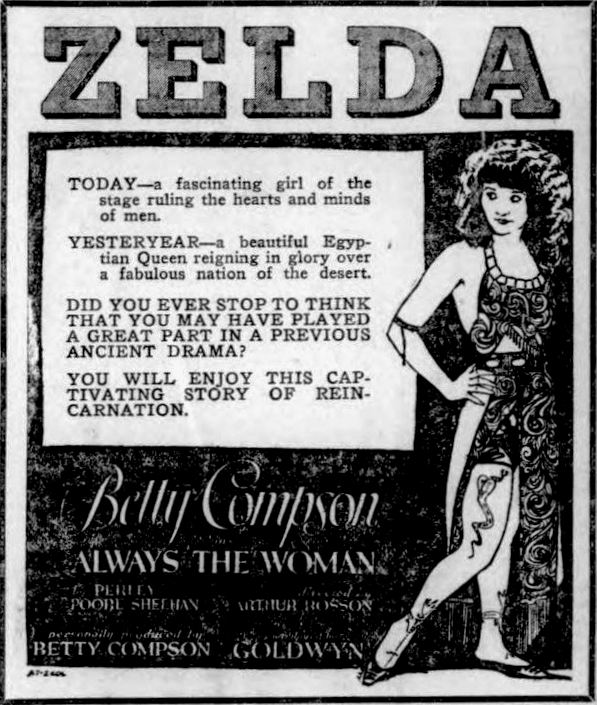
- Newspaper ad
- Directed by: Arthur Rosson
- Written by: Perley Poore Sheehan (story); Arthur Rosson (scenario)
- Produced by: Betty Compson
- Starring: Betty Compson
- Cinematography: Ernest Palmer
- Distributed by: Goldwyn Pictures
- Release date: July 9, 1922
- Running time: 6 reels 60 Minutes
- Country: United States
- Language: Silent (English intertitles)

Always the Woman is a 1922 American silent romance drama film produced by and starring Betty Compson and directed by Arthur Rosson. The film premiered in July of 1922 at the Capitol Theatre in New York City.

== Plot ==
Celia Thaxter is an American vaudeville actress who is on a journey to Egypt, becoming engaged to Reginald Stanhope during the voyage. Once they reach the Sahara desert, the couple becomes part of a treasure hunt led by another passenger native to the region, Kelim Pasha. During the trek, Pasha starts coming on to Celia, while Stanhope does nothing to help her, as it's revealed that he was merely a tool of Pasha. Celia is eventually saved by another woman in the party, who kills Pasha, and Celia finds true romance at last with an American whose life she had saved during her voyage.

== Cast ==
- Betty Compson as Celia Thaxter
- Emory Johnson as Herbert Boone
- Doris Pawn as Adele Boone
- Gerald Pring as Reginald Stanhope
- Richard Rosson as Mahmud
- Arthur Delmore as Gregory Gallup
- Macey Harlam as Kelim Pasha

== Preservation ==
An incomplete 35mm nitrate print of Always the Woman is held by the UCLA Film & Television Archive.
