= The Gift Girl =

1917 film

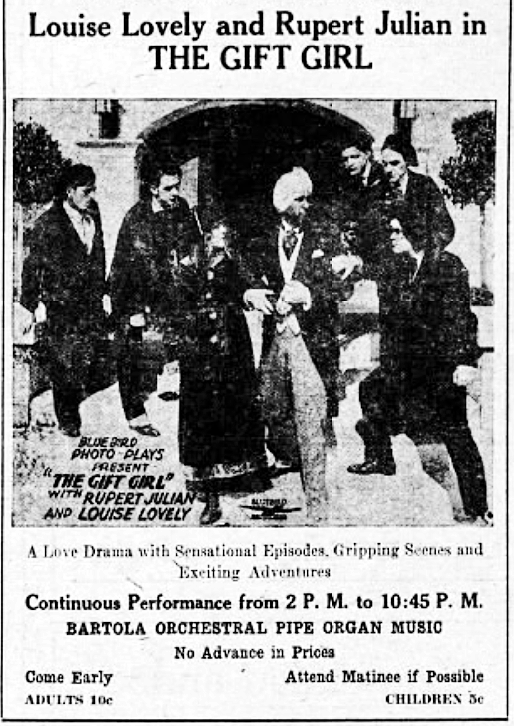
- Newspaper Theater Ad
- Directed by: Rupert Julian
- Written by: Harry R. Durant play; Elliott J. Clawson Screenwriter
- Produced by: Bluebird Photoplays
- Starring: Louise Lovely; Emory Johnson
- Cinematography: Stephen Rounds
- Distributed by: Universal
- Release date: March 26, 1917
- Running time: 5 reels 50 minutes
- Country: United States
- Language: Silent (English intertitles)

The Gift Girl is a 1917 American silent comedy directed by Rupert Julian based on the story by Harry R. Durant. The film stars Louise Lovely and Emory Johnson. The photoplay was produced by the Bluebird Photoplays. The film was released on March 26, 1917, by Universal.

The film is based on a play by Harry R. Durant titled "Marcel's Birthday Present."

== Plot ==
The movie unfolds as an English couple travels to the Middle East accompanied by their baby girl. After arriving, they choose to go on a hunting trip in one of Persia's (modern-day Iran) many forests. They also decide to have their daughter go with them on the trip.

Misfortune strikes when wild animals kill both of the baby's parents. The child survives. But she is now helpless and alone in the forest. Good fortune smiles upon the child. A man called Malec, played by Rupert Julian, stumbles across the tragedy. He discovers the helpless child. Malec decides to rescue the child, take her into his Persian household and raise her as his own. He names the girl – Rokaia.

Time passes and Rokaia, played by Louise Lovely, grows into a beautiful woman. Rokaia is now old enough to marry. Malec arranges for a wealthy rug merchant to marry Rokaia. Rokaia finds her potential husband offensive-looking. She refuses to marry the rug merchant. Rokaia decision goes against her step-father's choice. In Persia, a daughter cannot reject a father's preference for a marriage partner. Rather than honor her father wishes, Rokaia flees to France. After she escapes, Rokaia now finds herself alone and penniless in Paris.

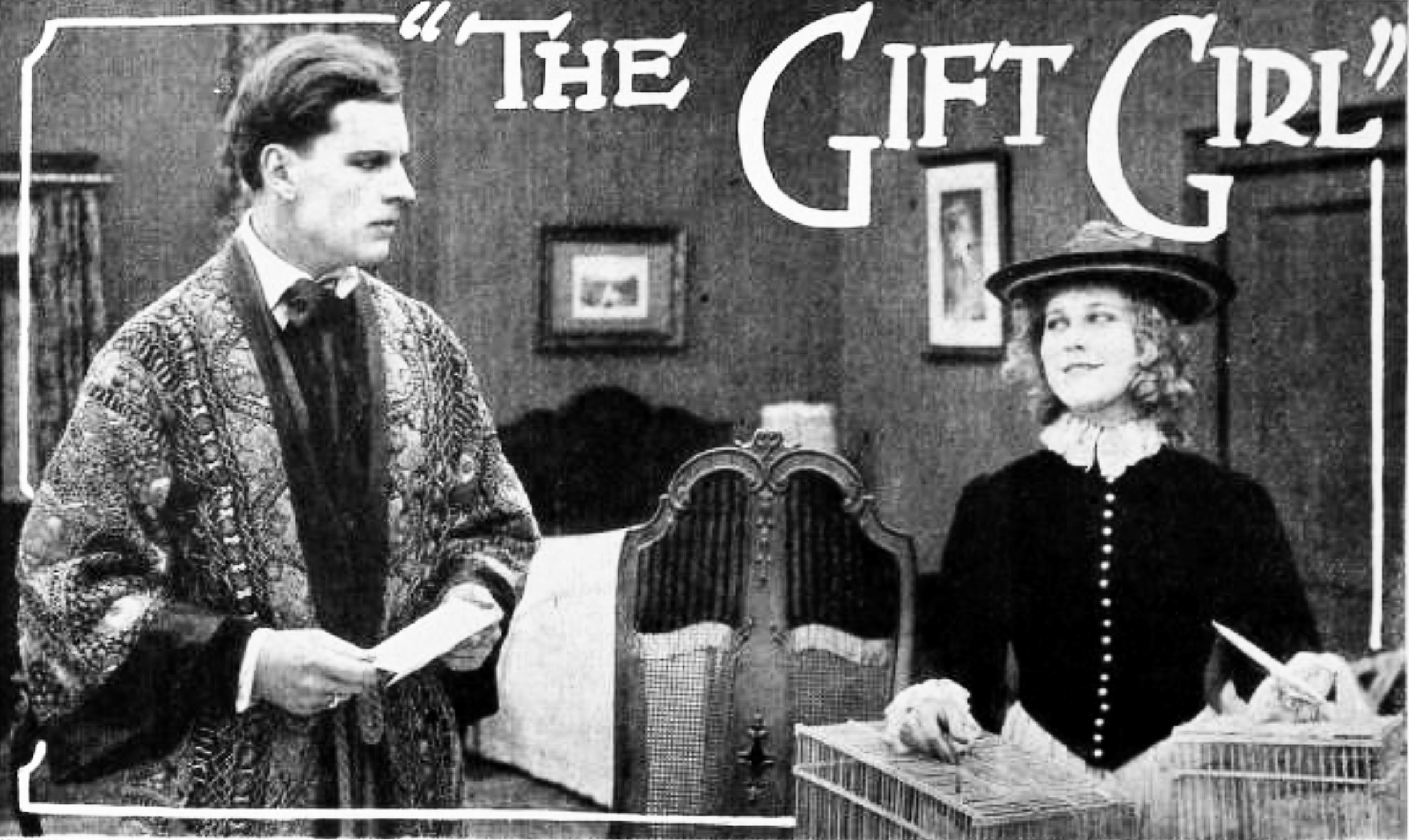

Fortune smiles again. A wealthy nobleman, Marquis de Tonquin played by Wadsworth Harris discovers Rokaia. He takes the young woman into his home as domestic help. The Marquis decides to hire (gift) her as a companion for his son Marcel played by Emory Johnson.

Marcel and Rokaia have some adventures, and Marcel ends up falling in love with “The Gift Girl.” Marcel asks for Rakaia's hand in marriage. The Marquis discovers Marcel's marriage plans. The Marquis's pleads with his son telling him he can only marry into a prominent family. He should not tie the knot with domestic help. The Marquis's pleas fall on deaf ears.

After time passes, the Marquis finally consents and Marcel and Rokaia get married.

== Cast ==
Actor	Role
Louise Lovely	Rokaia
Emory Johnson	Marcel
Rupert Julian	Malec
Wadsworth Harris	Marquis de Tonquin
Fred Montague	Dr. D'Eglantine
Winter Hall	Usun Hassan
Rex De Rosselli	Major Smyrthwaite Abercrombie

== Cast gallery ==
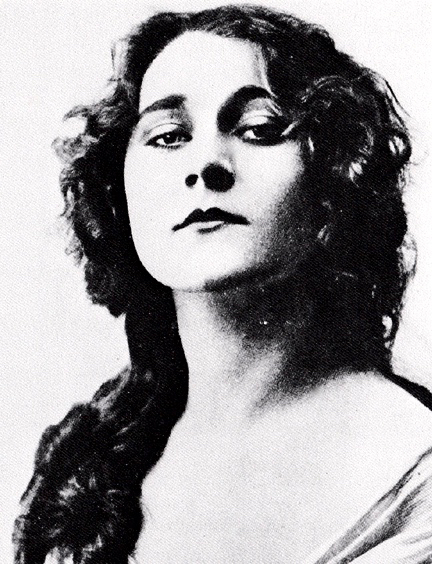
Louise Lovely

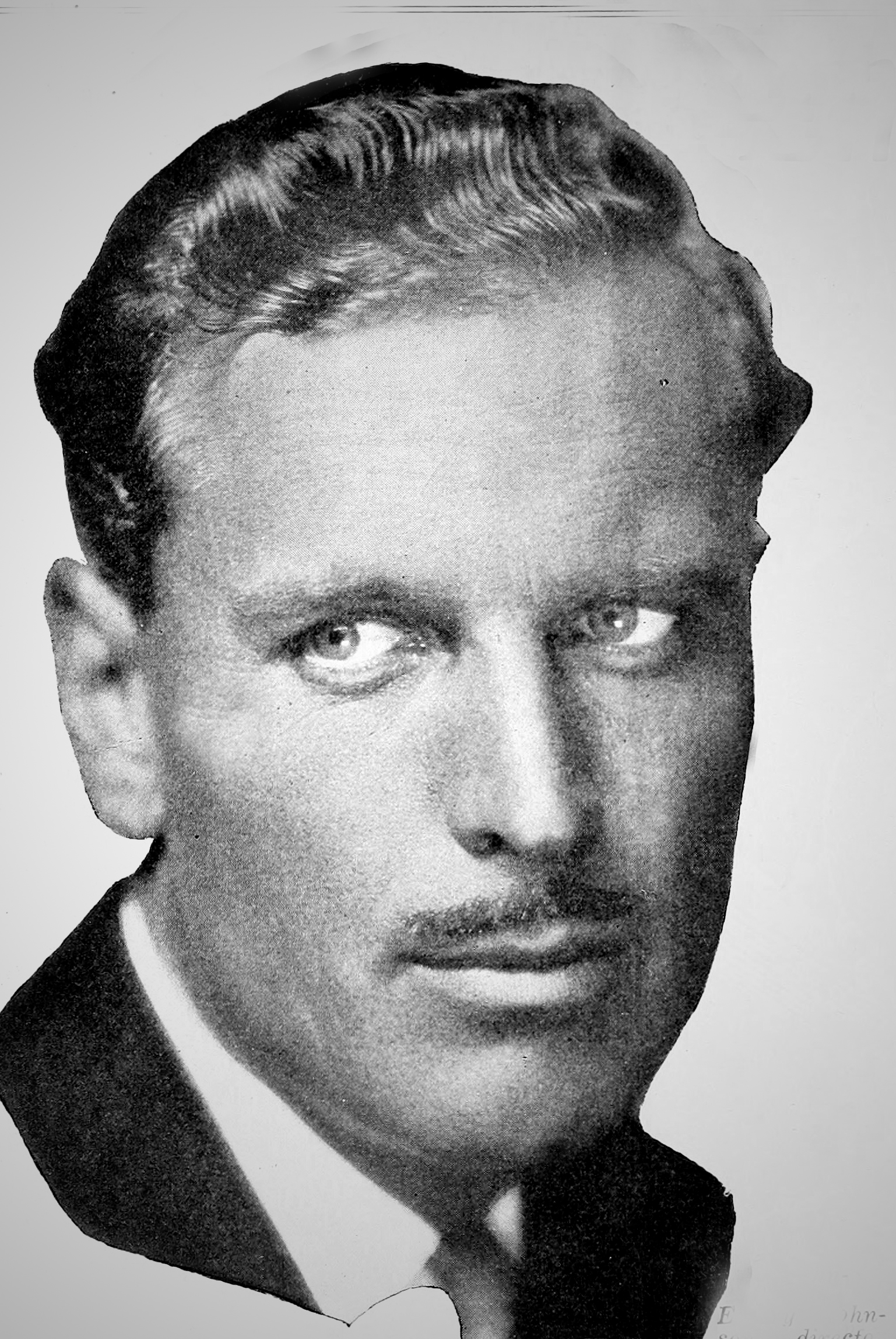
Emory Johnson

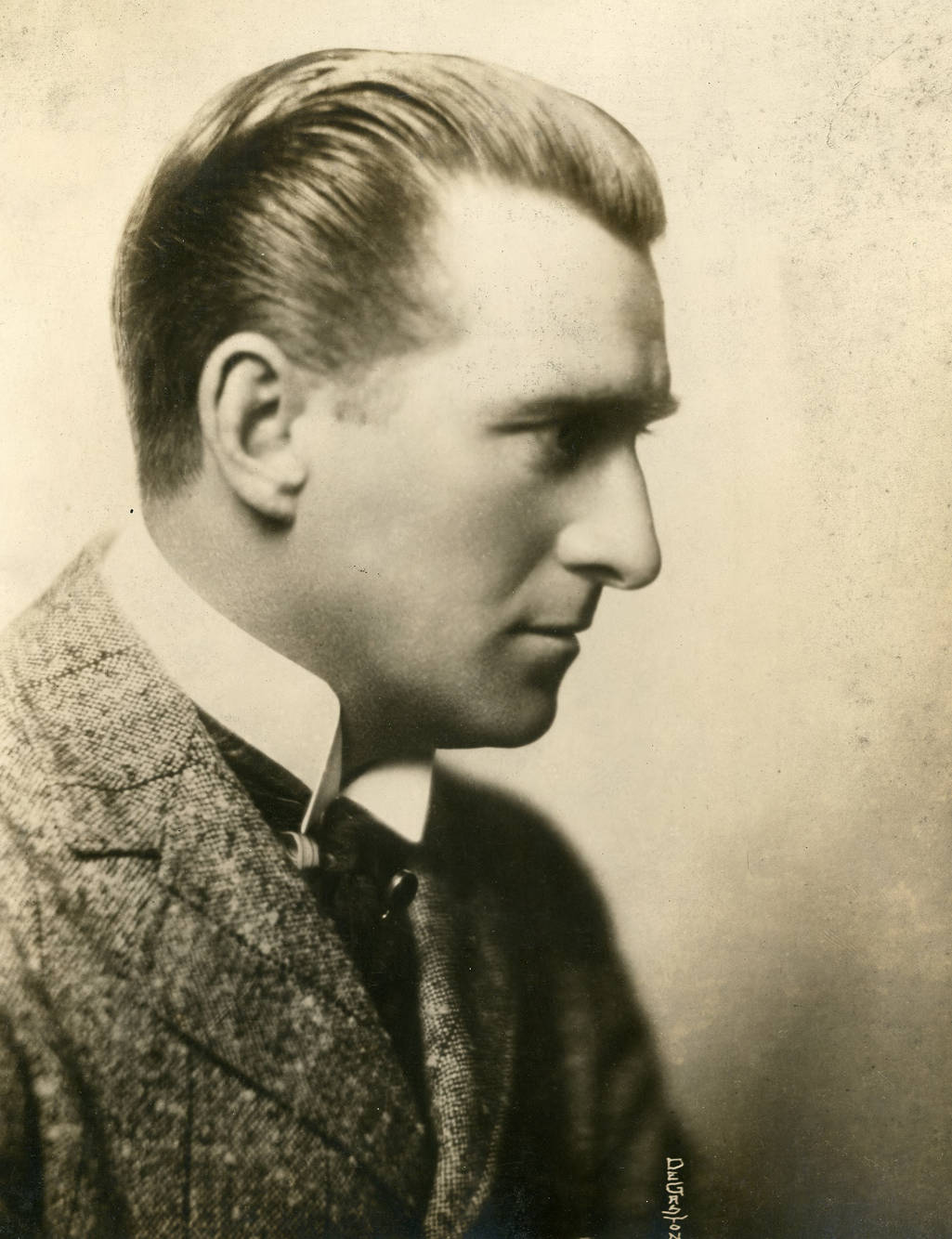
Rupert Julian

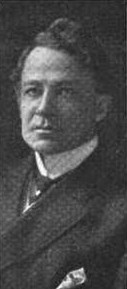
Wadsworth Harris

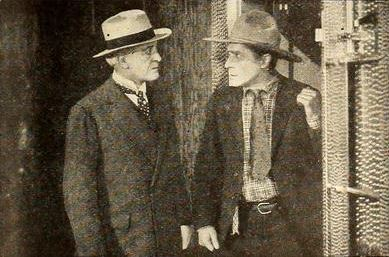
Winter Hall

== Production ==
This film was shot entirely on the backlot of Universal Studios located at 100 Universal City Plaza, Universal City, California.

This film was also known as (AKA):

- Marcel's Birthday Present
- The Mistress

== Preservation status ==
According to the Library of Congress website, a complete copy of this film survives.
