= Alias Mike Moran =

1919 film directed by James Cruze

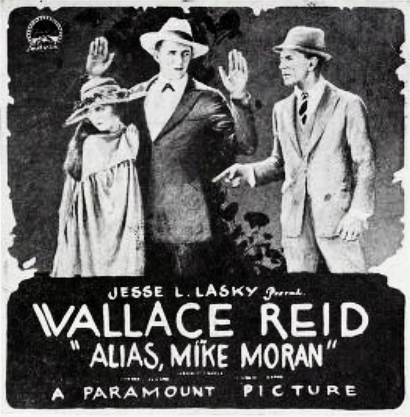
- Theatrical release poster
- Directed by: James Cruze
- Screenplay by: Frederick Orin Bartlett; Will M. Ritchey
- Produced by: Jesse L. Lasky
- Starring: Wallace Reid; Ann Little; Emory Johnson; Charles Ogle; Edythe Chapman; William Elmer
- Cinematography: Frank Urson
- Production company: Jesse L. Lasky Feature Play Company
- Distributed by: Paramount Pictures
- Release date: March 2, 1919
- Running time: 50 minutes
- Country: United States
- Language: Silent (English intertitles)

Alias Mike Moran is a lost 1919 American comedy silent film directed by James Cruze and written by Frederick Orin Bartlett and Will M. Ritchey. The film stars Wallace Reid, Ann Little, Emory Johnson, Charles Ogle, Edythe Chapman, and William Elmer. The film was released March 2, 1919, by Paramount Pictures.

== Cast ==
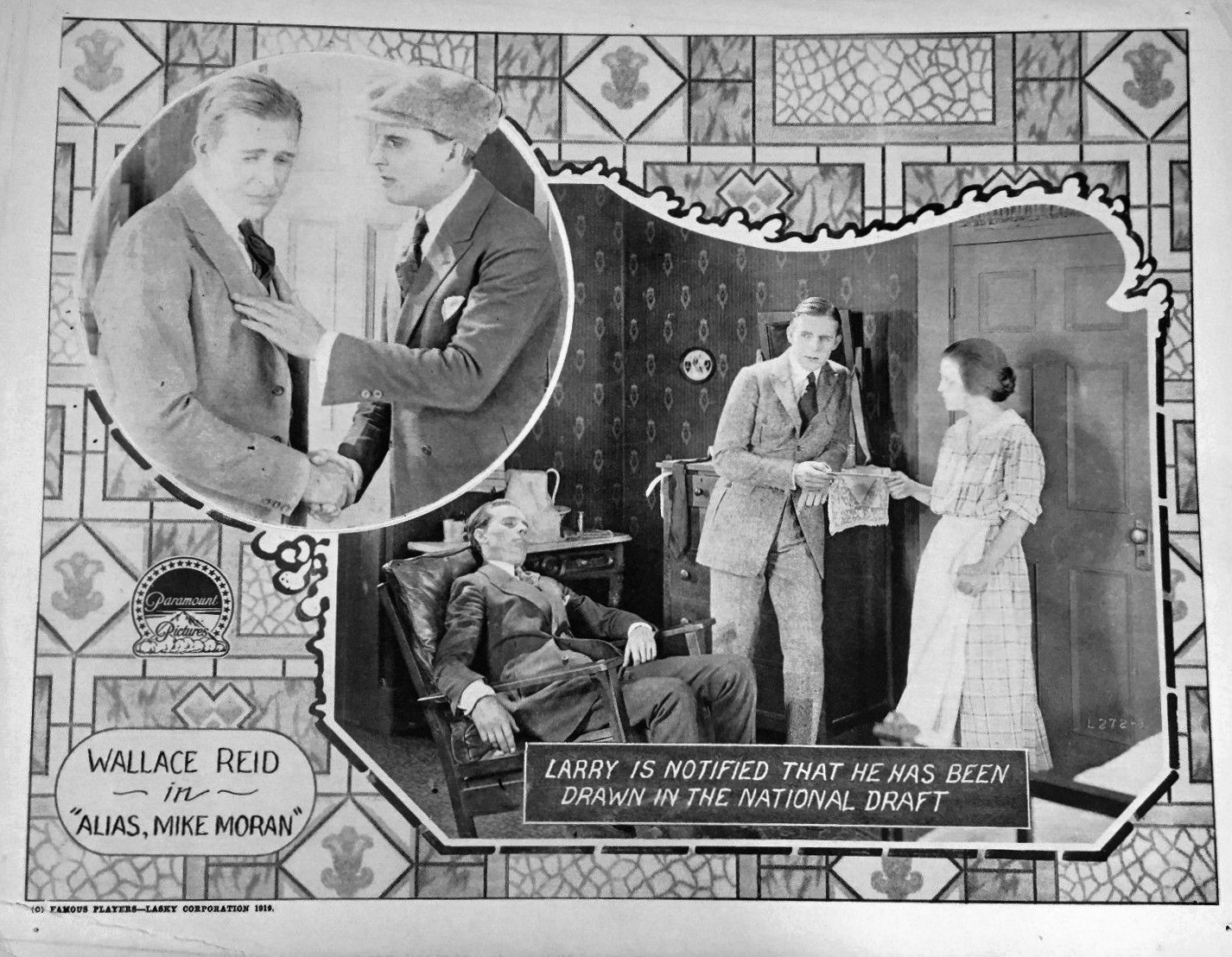
Lobby card

- Wallace Reid as Larry Young
- Ann Little as Elaine Debaux
- Emory Johnson as Mike Moran
- Charles Ogle as Peter Young
- Edythe Chapman as Ma Young
- William Elmer as Tick Flynn
- Winter Hall as Mr. Vandecar
- Jean Calhoun as Miss Vandecar
- Guy Oliver as Jim Day
