= Johanna Enlists =

- The full film
- Directed by: William Desmond Taylor
- Written by: Frances Marion
- Based on: the story "The Mobilization of Johanna" by Rupert Hughes
- Produced by: Mary Pickford
- Starring: Mary Pickford
- Cinematography: Charles Rosher
- Distributed by: Paramount Pictures
- Release date: September 15, 1918
- Running time: 5 reels; 4,388 feet
- Country: United States
- Language: Silent (English intertitles)

Johanna Enlists is a 1918 silent film comedy drama produced by and starring Mary Pickford with distribution by Paramount Pictures. The film was directed by William Desmond Taylor from a short story by Rupert Hughes, "The Mobilization of Johanna". Frances Marion, a frequent Pickford collaborator, wrote the scenario. The film was made at a time during World War I when sentimental or patriotic films were immensely popular. It was an early starring vehicle for Monte Blue, the male lead opposite Pickford. The film survives in several prints, including one at the Library of Congress.

== Plot ==
Farm girl Johanna Ransaller, lacking any other eligible men nearby, sets her affections on Mortimer, the family's hired man. Then she learns that he is already married. Unaware of this, Johanna's paw chases Mortimer away. Johanna works from six o'clock in the morning to ten at night, seven days a week, leaving her bored to tears. She prays to God for a beau. Her prayer is answered immediately, with the arrival of an American mounted unit (played by the 143rd Field Artillery, according to a later intertitle) that camps in the family's fields overnight.

Colonel Roberts, commander of the unit, asks Paw if a sick officer, Lieutenant Frank Le Roy, can sleep in the house; Johanna volunteers her bed, while she sleeps outside on the porch. In the morning, she brings Le Roy breakfast and feeds him. As she is leaving, she overhears him describing her to another soldier: "Wouldn't take a blue ribbon in a poultry show, but still—SOME chicken!" She is delighted. Then the unit is ordered to remain where it is for a couple of weeks.

When a soldier grabs her against her will, Private Vibbard intervenes and beats up the man. Later, an officer introduces her to the adjutant, who has a similar last name, Captain Archie van Renssaller. When she encounters Vibbard again, he gets too fresh, and she rebuffs him.

Le Roy gives Johanna a present, a parasol. She immediately finds it handy in fending off his romantic advances. Le Roy and Vibbard become jealous of each other.

Eager to improve herself, she engages in Isadora Duncan-style poses and movements. Her parents think she is having a fit. Then they see in the book a picture of a young woman, wearing only a transparent garment, whose pose she was imitating. They berate Johanna.

Later, Johanna sneaks out of the house. Le Roy, alerted by Johanna's brother Jimmy (for a coin), accuses her of going to see Vibbard. In reality, she goes into the shed to take a milk bath, having read that it will make her skin "like that of a baby". When she hears Le Roy approaching, she hastily gets out and puts on a robe. Le Roy laughs after finding out what she was doing. Then Vibbard enters and assumes the worst. When he refuses Le Roy's order to leave, he is arrested.

The next day, before Vibbard's court-martial, Johanna asks Le Roy to prevent his punishment. He tries to have the charges withdrawn, but fails. Johanna tries to go inside the tent where the court-martial is being held, but is barred. Then Major Whoppington, the president of the court, orders that she be brought in. As the trial goes on, somehow the focus shifts to which suitor Johanna will choose. Despite the two rivals nearly coming to blows, Vibbard is acquitted of all charges.

Afterward, Roberts notifies his men that they are leaving. Johanna tells them not to come back "'til you've taken the germ out of Germany." Jimmy (for two nickels) tells Le Roy and Vibbard where to find Johanna. They are disgusted to see her with Captain van Renssaller, who proposes to her. She nestles in his arms.

== Cast ==
- Mary Pickford as Johanna Ransaller
- Anne Schaefer as Maw Ransaller
- Fred Huntley as Paw Ransaller
- Monte Blue as Private Vibbard
- Douglas MacLean as Captain Archie van Renssaller
- Emory Johnson as Lieutenant Frank Le Roy
- John Steppling as Major Whoppington
- Wallace Beery as Colonel Roberts
- Wesley Barry as Johanna's brother
- June Prentis as Twin, Johanna's sister
- Jean Prentis as Twin, Johanna's sister
- Ralph Faneuf as Col. Ralph Faneuf
- Steve Murphy as Mortimer

== Reception ==
Like many American films of the time, Johanna Enlists was subject to cuts by city and state film censorship boards. For example, the Chicago Board of Censors required a cut in reel 4 of a virtually naked woman in a book.

== Gallery ==
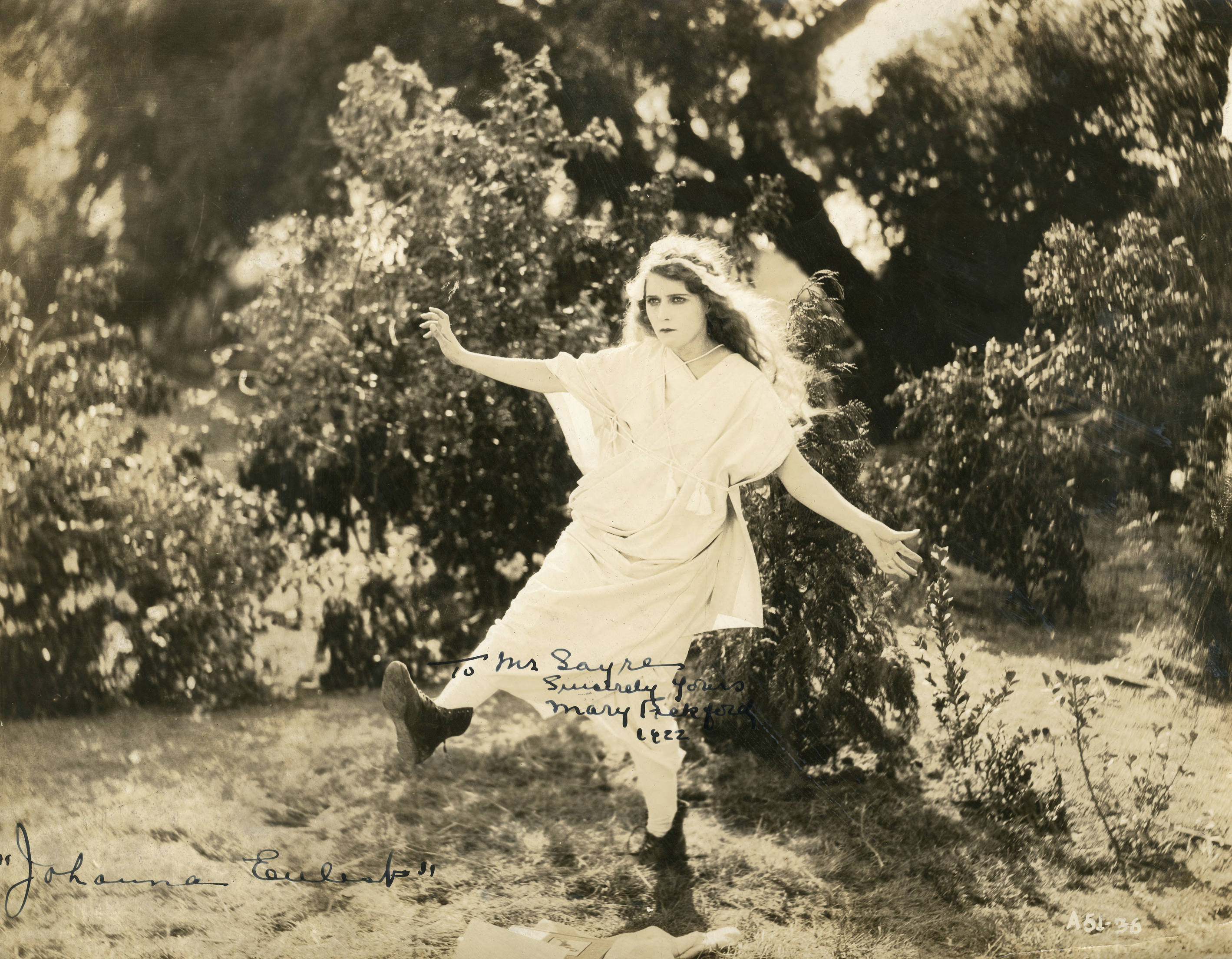
Pickford posing Isadora Duncan-style

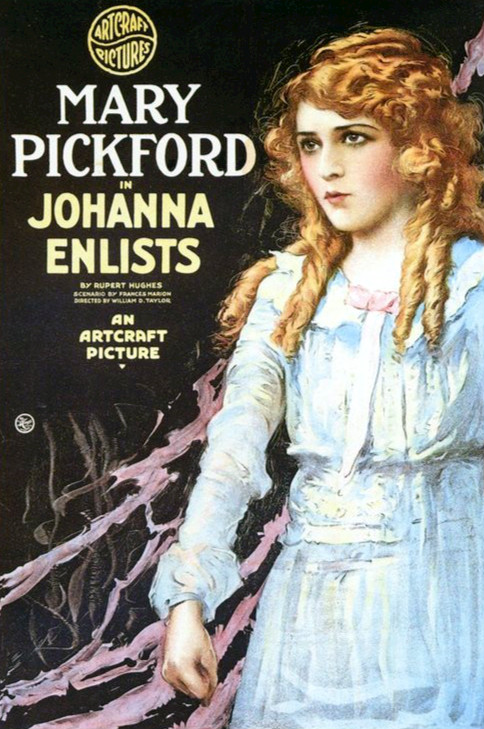
Film poster

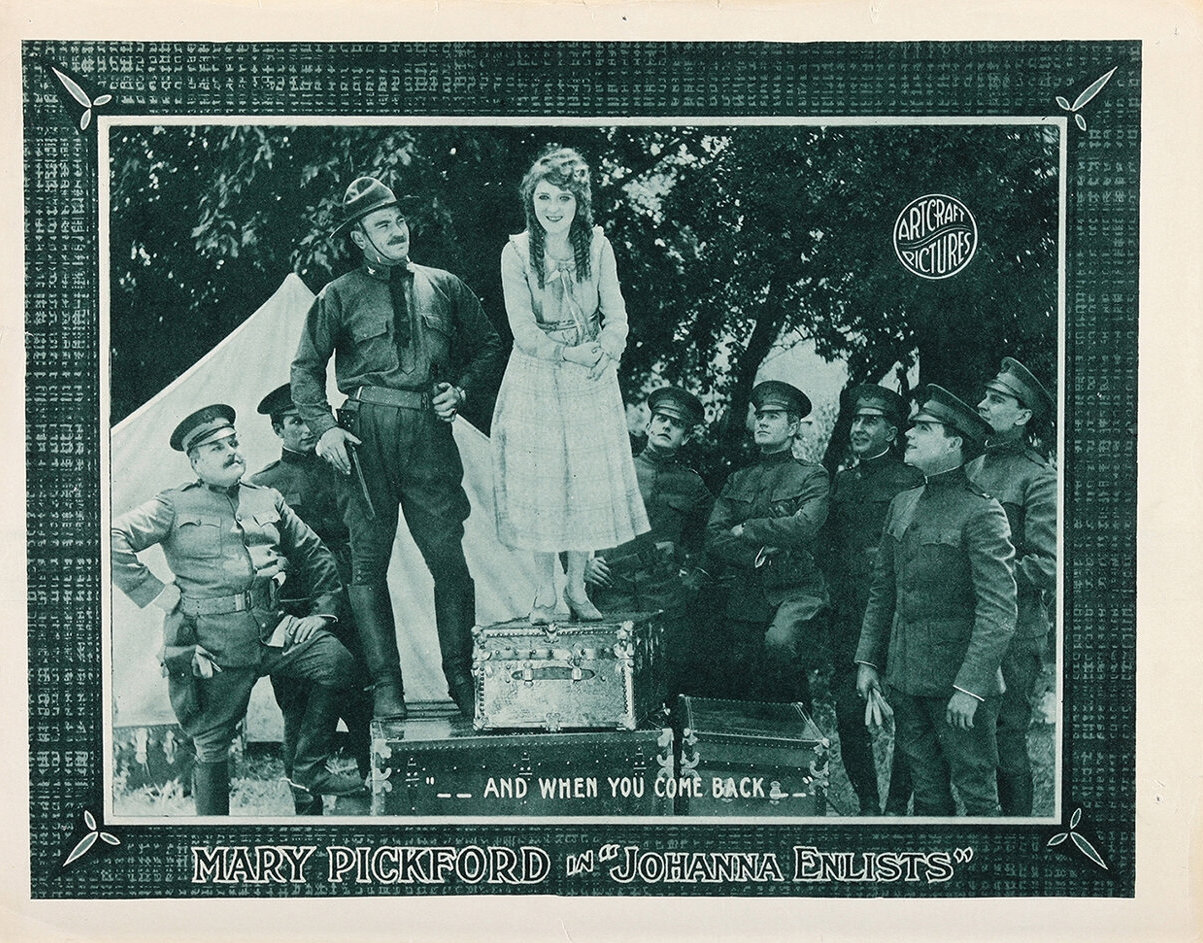
Lobby card

== Preservation status ==
The Library of Congress, in cooperation with the Mary Pickford Foundation, made a 4K scan, and the result was released on both DVD and Blu-ray.
