= The Woman Next Door (1919 film) =

1919 American drama film directed by Robert G. Vignola

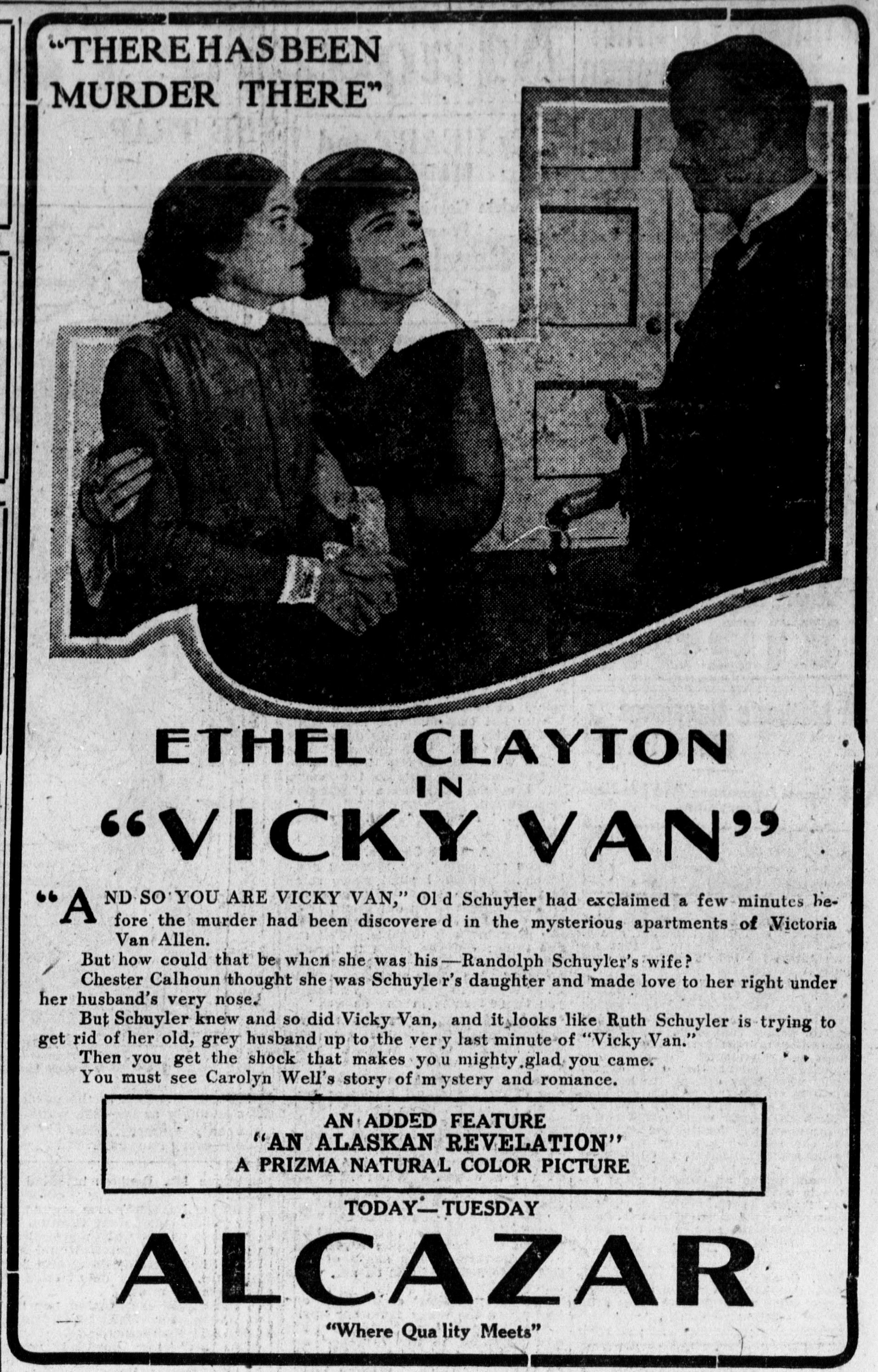
- Newspaper advertisement for the film using the name Vicky Van
- Directed by: Robert G. Vignola
- Screenplay by: Marion Fairfax
- Based on: Vicky Van; 1918 novel by Carolyn Wells
- Produced by: Jesse L. Lasky
- Starring: Ethel Clayton; Anthony Coldeway; Emory Johnson; Jane Wolfe
- Cinematography: Charles Edgar Schoenbaum
- Production company: Famous Players–Lasky Corporation
- Distributed by: Paramount Pictures
- Release date: May 18, 1919
- Running time: 5 reels 50 minutes
- Country: United States
- Language: Silent (English intertitles)

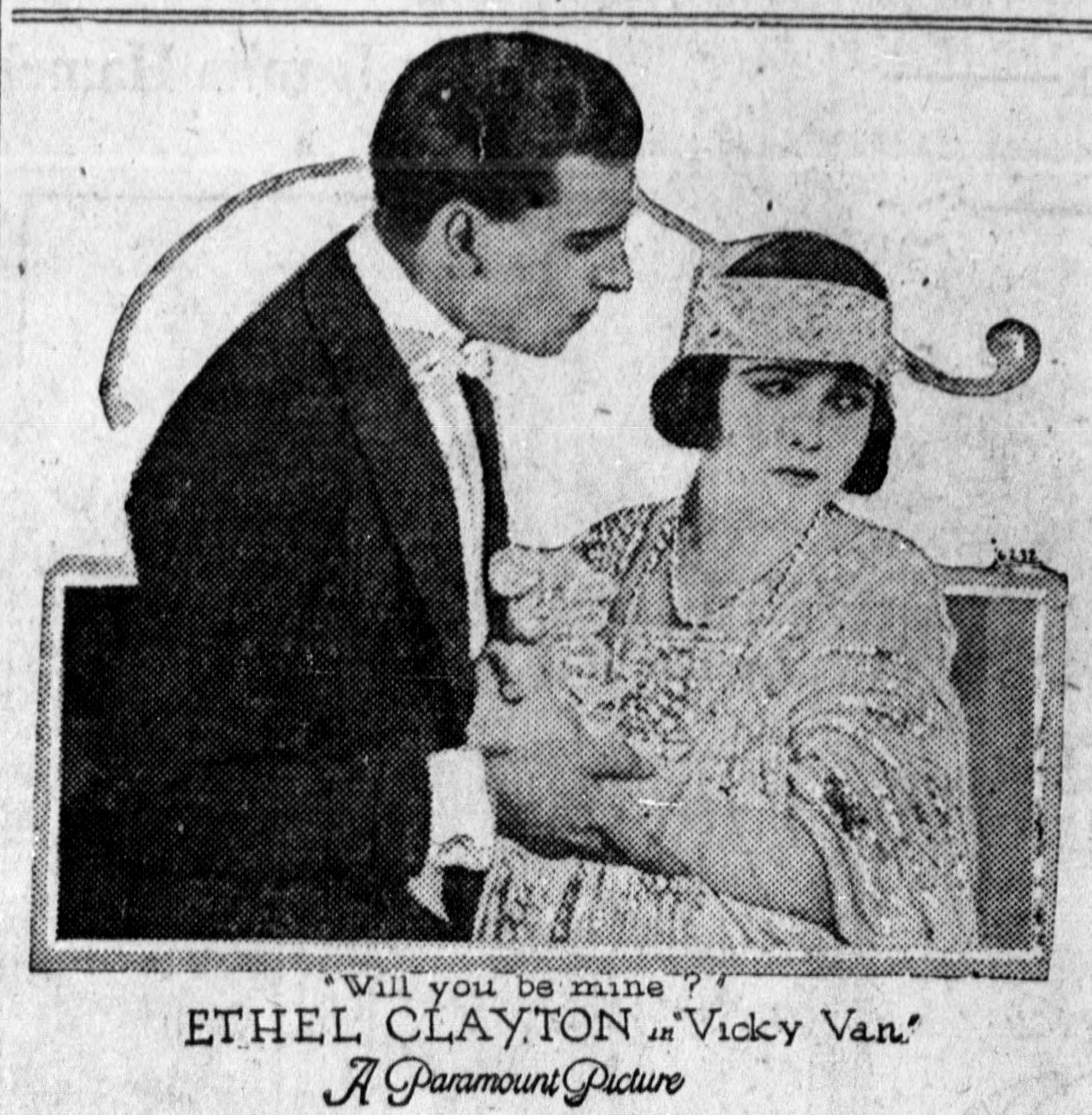
Publicity for the film

The Woman Next Door is a 1919 American silent drama film directed by Robert G. Vignola and written by Carolyn Wells. The film stars Ethel Clayton, Emory Johnson, Noah Beery, Sr., Jane Wolfe, Katherine Griffith, and Genevieve Blinn. The film was released on May 18, 1919, by Paramount Pictures.

== Plot ==
A man mistakes another man's wife as that man's daughter and starts a love affair with her.

== Cast ==
| Actor | Role |
|---|---|
| Frank Whitson | August |
| Ethel Clayton | Mrs. Randolph Schuyler / Vicky Van |
| Emory Johnson | Chester Calhoun |
| Noah Beery, Sr. | Randolph Schuyler |
| Jane Wolfe | Tibbetts / 'Julie' |
| Katherine Griffith | Rhoda Schuyler |
| Genevieve Blinn | Helen Schuyler |
| Josephine Crowell | Aunt Eleanor Endicott |
| Clarence Geldart | Mae Hughes |

== Production ==
The working titles for the film were The Girl Next Door and Vicky.

== Preservation status ==
No prints exist of this film.
