= Polly of the Storm Country =

1920 film

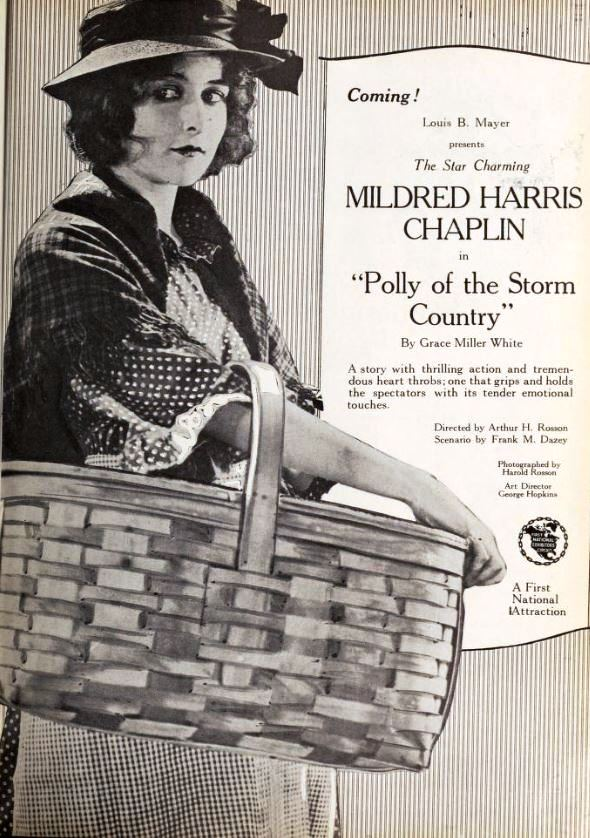
- Advertisement for the American film Polly of the Storm Country on page 13 of the Exhibitors Herald (April 3, 1920)
- Directed by: Arthur Rosson
- Screenplay by: Frank Mitchell Dazey
- Based on: Storm Country Polly by Grace Miller White
- Produced by: Louis B. Mayer
- Starring: Mildred Harris; Emory Johnson; Charlotte Burton; Harry Northrup; Ruby Lafayette; Maurice Valentin
- Cinematography: Harold Rosson
- Production company: Chaplin-Mayer Pictures Company
- Distributed by: First National Exhibitors' Circuit
- Release date: April 4, 1920
- Running time: 50 minutes
- Country: United States
- Language: Silent (English intertitles)

Polly of the Storm Country is a lost 1920 American silent drama film directed by Arthur Rosson and written by Frank Mitchell Dazey. The film stars Mildred Harris, Emory Johnson, Charlotte Burton, Harry Northrup, Ruby Lafayette, and Maurice Valentin. It is based on the 1920 novel Storm Country Polly by Grace Miller White. The film was released on April 4, 1920, by First National Exhibitors' Circuit.

== Cast ==
- Mildred Harris as Polly
- Emory Johnson as Robert Robertson
- Charlotte Burton as Evelyn Robertson
- Harry Northrup as Marcus MacKenzie
- Ruby Lafayette as Granny Hope
- Maurice Valentin as Jeremiah Hopkins
- Charles West as Oscar Bennett
- Mickey Moore as Wee Jerry
