= The Third Alarm (1922 film) =

1922 film

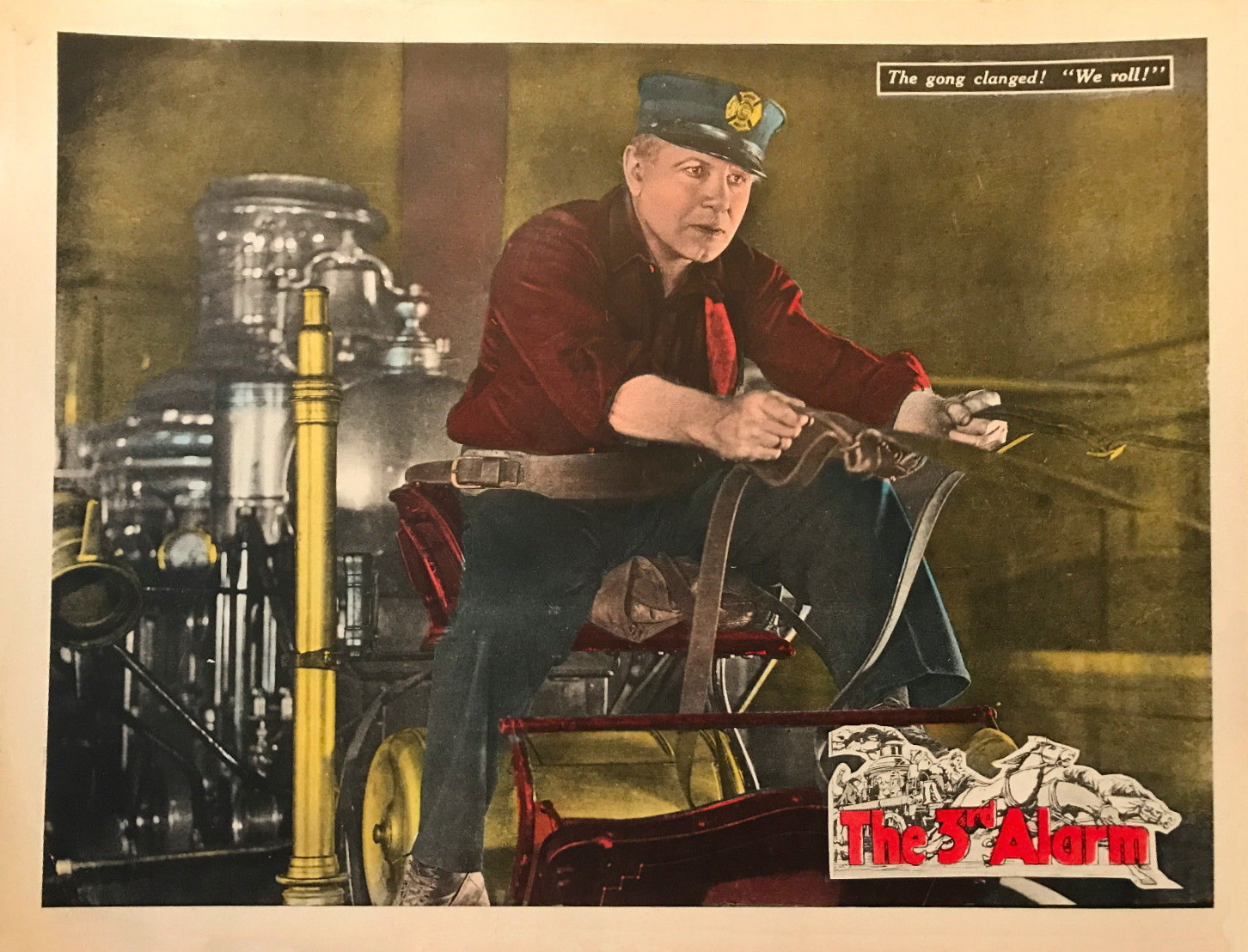
- Lobby card
- Directed by: Emory Johnson; Dick Rosson Asst dir
- Written by: Emilie Johnson
- Screenplay by: Emilie Johnson
- Produced by: Pat Powers; Emory Johnson
- Starring: Ralph Lewis; Johnnie Walker; Ella Hall
- Cinematography: Henry Sharp
- Color process: Black and White
- Distributed by: Film Booking Offices of America
- Release date: January 7, 1923
- Running time: Seven (7) reels; 6,700 feet 70 minutes
- Country: United States
- Languages: Silent (English intertitles); Titles: Carrol Owen

The Third Alarm is a 1922 American silent melodrama directed by Emory Johnson. FBO released the film in January 1923. The film's "All-Star" cast included Ralph Lewis, Johnnie Walker, and Johnson's wife, Ella Hall. Emilie Johnson, Johnson's mother, wrote both the story and screenplay. The Third Alarm was the second picture in Johnson's eight-picture contract with FBO.

Dan McDowell was a veteran fireman and driver of a horse-drawn Fire Engine. The department motorizes the station's equipment. Dan cannot master the driving skills needed to operate the new motorized vehicles. The fire chief retires Dan with a small pension. Johnny, Dan's son, is studying to become a doctor. Dan supported his son's ambitions but could not keep his family and Johnnie's schooling. He takes a job digging ditches. Circumstances befall Dan, and he lives through various misfortunes. Johnnie, no longer able to afford medical school, works as a fireman. All storylines converge as a three-alarm fire breaks out. This Melodrama has a predictable happy ending.

== Plot ==
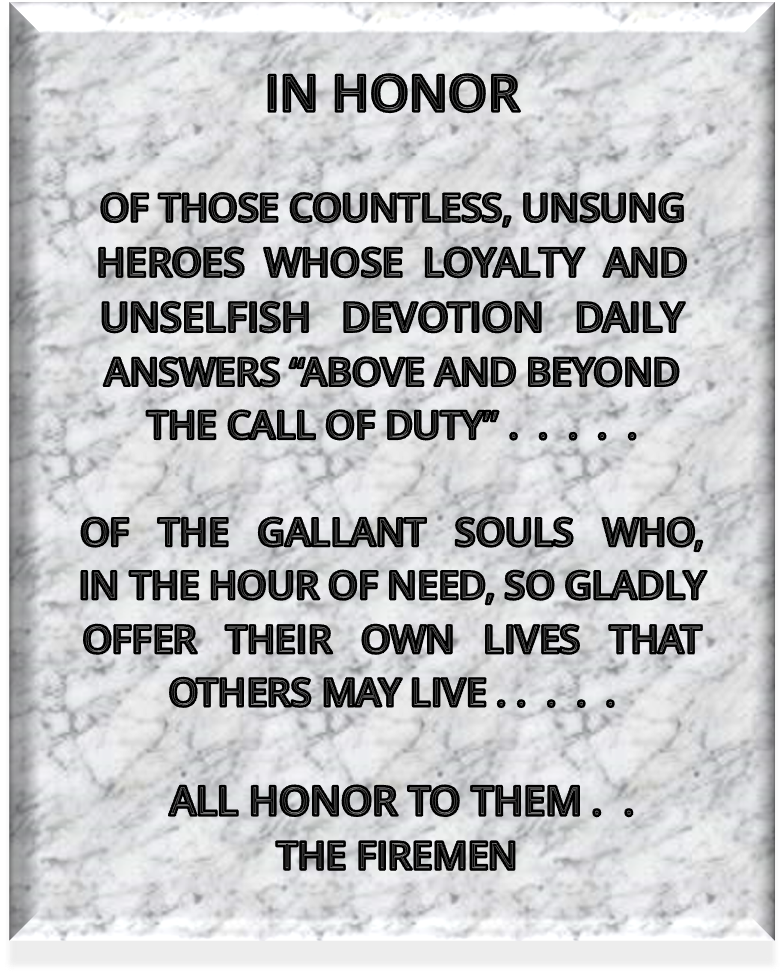
Opening plaque from the movie

The action starts when someone trips a remote Fire alarm call box. Then, the Fire station alarm bell clangs, and a fire dispatcher shouts, "We roll - third and western." All the firefighters jump into action, the doors swing wide, and the two horse-drawn fire engines race down the street to battle the fire. We pay particular attention to engine number seven, a steam pumper operated by an aging firefighter - Dan McDowell. McDowell has been a member of the force for two decades and drives engine number seven. He also maintains the fire station's five fire horses.

Mother McDowell is frosting Dan's birthday cake with the couple's daughter at the McDowell house, which stands caddy-corner from the fire station. Johnny McDowell joins the group. Johnny is studying to become a doctor and has only a year left. We meet Johnny's sweetheart, June Rutherford. Dan attends the party later in the day, but looks very downcast.

The battalion chief travels to the station house and informs the boys they intend to motorize the station. All the men applaud except Dan, who does not look too pleased. The day of the changeover arrives, and the fire crew watches as the new motorized steam pumpers drive in. Dan must learn to drive the motorized pumper truck but struggles to master basic driving skills. Unable to drive the new rig, the chief retires Dan McDowell on a small pension. Later, the chief sells the five fire horses.

Dan's foremost concern now is Johnny's medical career. Dan tells Johnny he has not saved enough money to support his medical studies. Johnny tells his father not to worry because his sweetheart is the daughter of a famous surgeon - Dr. Loren Rutherford. Dan tells Johnny that his brother got ill when he was a young father. The boy's physician told Dan that only one man could save the boy - Dr. Loren Rutherford. Dan storms into Dr. Rutherford's office and pleads with the Dr. to save his boy. Dr. Rutherford says he cannot save Dan's son because he must save another life first. Dan tells Johnny he will never forget that Dr. Rutherford let his young brother die.

To make ends meet, Dan takes a job as a ditch digger. While working one day, he feels Bullet nuzzling against him. Bullet had been pulling a dirt wagon but, upon catching sight of his old handler, paid a visit. Bullet's overseer sees what his horse is doing. He walks over to the animal and starts mishandling the poor horse. Dan attempted to stop the supervisor's abuse, but the supervisor overpowered him. Johnny chances upon the altercation and thrashes Bullet's handler. He then warns the supervisor about further abuse and suggests that Dan seek a new job. Johnny realizes there is one way to ease Dan's financial burdens. He drops out of medical school and applies for a job at the fire station. The chief knows Johnny and makes him a firefighter. The next day, the police arrive at the McDowell household. They claim a fire horse is missing and blame Johnny. The police have a search warrant and find "Bullet" in Dan's shed—the police demand to know where Johnny is. To save his son the embarrassment, Dan confessed to the crime. They promptly sent him to jail.

A fire breaks out in the Rutherford apartment building where June Rutherford lives on the top floor. She evacuates the building with the other residents but discovers her dog is missing. She rushes into the burning building to rescue her dog, but becomes trapped by the flames. Johnny is at the fire station when the fire bell clangs. He discovers the fire is at the new Rutherford apartments. The dispatcher says they only respond if it becomes a third alarm. Freddie is selling newspapers when he reads about Dan's arrest as a horse thief. He rushes to the fire station, tells the fire chief he found Bullet on the street, and locks him up in Dan's woodshed. The chief says he will go to jail and have Dan released.

Meanwhile, at the fire scene, they issue a third alarm. Johnny and his fire company rush to the location of the fire. June is still seeking an escape when she finds an open balcony. She scurries to the balcony and starts screaming for help. The nearest fire truck approaches the deck and raises its ladder to rescue her, but the ladder is too short. Suddenly, a lone firefighter scrambles up the ladder–it is Johnny trying to save his beloved June. The apartment walls start collapsing, so the battalion chief orders his men to safety. Then the wall supporting the end of the ladder collapses, but at the last moment, Johnny hooks a Scaling ladder to the balcony. He climbs the ladder to the balcony, rescuing June and her dog. Now they must escape to safer ground. While June and the dog hold tight to him, he drops to the balcony below.

Dan has secured his release from jail and rushes to the fire scene, helping fellow firefighters handle the hoses. While the fire blazes, a loud thunder is heard, and a massive safe crashes through several apartment floors. The crumbling floors pull Johnny and June down, but somehow, they endure the fall. The safe now blocks their escape route.

Meanwhile, Dr. Rutherford finds Dan and begs him to save his daughter. Dan has flashbacks about his adolescent son, but he brushes them aside. Working the night shift, Bullet hears the fire alarm, breaks free of his reins, and heads toward the flames. Dan is struggling with a way to save Johnny and June when Bullet arrives. Dan has an idea and thinks he has a way to save the couple. He mounts Bullet, rides through the flames, comes to the spot where the safe has fallen, and throws ropes around the safe. Dan then urges Bullet to pull the safe free. Bullet obliges and frees Johnny and June. They finally bring the fire under control.

The scene switches to a farmhouse in the country. Dan discovers that Dr. Rutherford has bought a small farm with enough pasture to care for all the fire horses. Dan will become the caretaker. It fades out with Dan holding Bullet and Johnny holding June.

== Cast ==
The cast of this film used several of the same actors who appeared in In the Name of the Law.

| Actor | Role |
|---|---|
| Ralph Lewis | Dan McDowell |
| Johnnie Walker | Johnny McDowell |
| Ella Hall | June Rutherford |
| Virginia True Boardman | Mother McDowell |
| Frankie Lee | Little Jimmie |
| Wilbur Higby | Fire Chief Andrews |
| Richard Morris | Dr. Loren Rutherford |
| Josephine Adair | Alice McDowell |

== Production ==
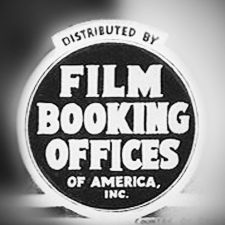
FBO logo

Film Booking Offices of America (FBO) was an energetic, independent American silent era film studio. The company released around 110 features and shorts a year. The company focused on producing low-budget films emphasizing first-class westerns, action films, romantic melodramas, and comedy shorts. The company mainly distributed its pictures to small-town venues and independent theater chains, which changed their pictures three times a week. FBO would make their pictures appeal to every member of the American family.

The average cost per FBO production was $50,000 to $75,000 equivalent to $961,730 to $1,442,594 in 2021 compared to the Major film studios which could spend five times as much to produce a movie.

FBO also produced and distributed a limited number of big-budget features labeled "Gold Bond" or "Special" productions.

=== Pre production ===
"To make this production as accurate and authentic as possible, I lived for several weeks among the firemen of Los Angeles to get the color and atmosphere for my production."

— Emory Johnson
Director,

A real estate dealer's misfortune allowed Emory Johnson to purchase a five-story apartment building on the outskirts of Los Angeles for a reasonable price. The city had condemned the building as a fire trap. To film the burning-building sequences in The Third Alarm, the building was set ablaze. The fire was under the Los Angeles fire department's supervision and used a dozen companies of professional firefighters and scores of equipment.

Emory Johnson would shoot this movie on location in Los Angeles, California. The studio location, coupled with the fact that LAFD was the largest fire department globally, had a sizable contingent of retired fire horses and would allow the use of scrapped steam engines in the movie to lend itself to a symbiotic relationship. In 1911, the LAFD had 25 horse-drawn steam fire engines and 163 horses. 1911 was the last year they remained in service and the first year of motorized apparatus on the LAFD. The phase-in of motorized equipment would continue until the previous fire horse was retired in 1921.

==== Development ====
While standing on a street corner in downtown Los Angeles, Emory Johnson and his mother watched the annual Elk 's parade. Apart from the parade, the pair was struck by the appearance of the LAPD 's fire horses. This parade would be the fire horse's last appearance in public. The horses had all been replaced by motorized vehicles. All were retired from service and put out to pasture. But the fire horses represented a small part of a broader canvas to the Johnsons.

It occurred to them; the horses symbolized a changing of the guard. The idea for a motion picture took root.

==== Casting ====
- Ralph Lewis (1872–1931) was born on October 8, 1872, in Englewood, Illinois. The 50 year-old actor landed the leading man role in this production. He played a rugged middle-aged Firefighter, Dan McDowell. He was previously the leading man in the Johnson production – In the Name of the Law. He would have future starring roles in Johnson vehicles, including The Mailman and The Last Edition. The Last Edition was Lewis's fifth and final film in a Johnson production.

Lewis's film debut came in 1911. Lewis appeared in 160 films between 1912 and 1938. Lewis will always be remembered for his role as abolitionist U.S. Representative Austin Stoneman in D. W. Griffith's The Birth of a Nation (1915) and the governor in Intolerance (1916). (Note: A 1924 article in Camera! noted: Ralph Lewis, since starting his career in motion pictures with D. W. Griffith at the old Biograph company thirteen years ago, has played in one hundred and fourteen screen dramas, ranging from the split-reelers put out by the Biograph and including the big Griffith special twelve-reel features like "Intolerance" and "The Birth of a Nation. He has played the role of a judge seven times, a politician ten times, a police officer three times, and has portrayed a ship captain twice. He has committed twenty-seven murders and incidentally was killed thirty times. Lewis has been before the camera in twenty-two deathbed scenes. He has fought numerous duels and has gone down with sinking boats on three occasions. He has played father to almost all of the big screen stars, including Mary Pickford, Norma and Constance Talmadge, Alice Terry, Lillian Gish, and many others. However, he has never played the role of a farmer.) The June 5, 1923, edition of the Poughkeepsie Eagle-News observed: "Ralph Lewis, is especially good in parts built upon strength of character ..."
Lewis stated after the completion of the movie "I wouldn't go through it again for love nor money. If I did it once, I risked my life a dozen times. I had to duck flying debris, blazing timbers, hurling bricks, and whatnot. After that job, I hope the folks enjoy it when they see it on the screen." FBO rewarded Ralph Lewis for his work In the Name of the Law, The Third Alarm, and The West~Bound Limited by placing him under a long-term contract in April 1923.

- Johnnie Walker (1894–1949) was born on January 7, 1894, in New York City, New York. He was an upcoming star when the 29 year-old actor when he played the supporting role of Johnny McDowell, Dan McDowell's son. Like other cast members, he had a role in Johnson's previous production In the Name of the Law as Johnnie O'Hara, the son of Ralph Lewis's character – Patrick O'Hara. Walker appeared in five Johnson FBO productions. In every production, he played the son of the working-class father. Walker would be featured in Johnson's sixth film for FBO – Life's Greatest Game, released in October 1924. That film was Walker's fifth and final role in an Emory Johnson production. Walker is five feet eleven inches tall, with black hair and blue eyes. AFI credits the actor with 48 Titles in his Filmography.
- Ella Hall (1896–1981) was born on March 17, 1896, in Hoboken, New Jersey. Johnson chose Ella Hall to play the female lead in this movie. She was 26. She played June Rutherford, Dr. Rutherford's daughter. Like many of the cast of this film, Hall's last film was In the Name of the Law Her husband, Emory Johnson, coaxed her out of domestic life to take the feminine leads in this film and his next film The West~Bound Limited.

After wrapping The West~Bound Limited, she landed a role in the 1923 production of Lloyd B. Carleton's The Flying Dutchman. It would become one of her best-known performances. After filming The Dutchman, Hall retired from silent movies to focus on her two boys and her rocky marriage to Emory Johnson. She came out of retirement to accept uncredited roles in the films Madam Satan, released in 1930, and The Bitter Tea of General Yen, released in 1932.

- Virginia True Boardman (1889–1971) was born Margaret Shields on May 23, 1889, in Fort Davis, Texas. She was 33 when she played mother McDowell, the McDowell family matriarch. This was her first role in a Johnson production. Boardman began her theatrical career in 1906 and would continue to appear in 52 films between 1911 and 1936.
- Richard (Dick) Morris (1862–1924) was born on January 30, 1862, in Charlestown, Massachusetts. The 60 year-old actor played Dr. Loren Rutherford. He had previously play Mr. Lucus in In the Name of the Law. Morris usually played character roles and heavies. His early education included spending three years overseas studying grand opera. His first professional work was touring America for two seasons as an opera singer. He then spent three years in London singing opera. In September 1909, he joined the Lubin organization and made his first movie appearance in 1912 when he was 50.

Morris would act in future Johnson productions, The Mailman and The Spirit of the USA, before his untimely death in October 1924.

- Wilbur Higby (Wilbur Higbee Jones) (1867–1934), was an American actor of the silent era. He was born on August 21, 1867, in Meridian, Mississippi. The 55 year-old actor played Fire Chief Andrews. This was his first acting role in a Johnson production. Higby usually played character roles. He appeared in more than 70 films between 1914 — 1934. His career spanned 49 years alternating between Stage and Screen.

Higby started life as a played professional baseball in Grand Rapids, Michigan, before he moved to the stage. Higby than began his career in the entertainment business on the Legitimate stage in the mid-1890s. He was a member of a stock company. He later performed with other stock groups in various locales. In 1903, Higby formed his own troupe, the Wilbur Higby Dramatic Company. The Fort Wayne Sentinel, described the company as "one of the highest class repertoire organizations in this country." He moved to Hollywood in 1913 and appeared in his first film in 1914.

- Frankie Lee (1911–1970), was an American child actor of the silent era. He was born on December 31, 1911, in Gunnison, Colorado. The 11 year-old actor played Little Jimmie. This was his first acting role in a Johnson production. He appeared in 56 films between 1916 and 1925. He was the older brother of child actor Davey Lee.
- Josephine Adair (1921–1966) was born on June 27, 1916, in Lamar, Colorado. Adair was 6 when she acted in the role of Alice McDowell, Johnny McDowell younger sister. Like many of the cast members of this movie, Adair had also acted in In the Name of the Law. She was an established child star when filming started on this production. Josephine Adair was the younger sister of another child actress, Elizabeth Adair.

==== Director ====
Emory Johnson was a former actor turned filmmaker when he oversaw this film. Johnson was 28 years old when he finished this film. He had previously made his directorial debut filming In the Name of the Law. The Third Alarm was the second film in Emory Johnson's eight-picture contract with FBO. Johnson began his acting career in 1912. He secured work as an extra in early Broncho Billy Westerns. He acted in 73 movies between 1912 and 1922 for the likes of Essanay, Universal, Pathé, and Goldwyn. In 1921, he thought the time was right to start directing movies. Johnson convinced FBO to finance his first movie for the company – In the Name of the Law. Since the movie was a financial success, he was given the opportunity to direct this film.

During his career at FBO, he would earn titles including the Master of Melodrama, King of Exploitation, and Hero of the Working Class. They would include this drama in all the categories. (Note: We have come to the day when the public is demanding consistent, human stories. We do not believe that the American people want to see only pictures of the ultra-rich. Our characters are simple folk — belonging to the great American middle class. The drama and comedy of their lives will reflect the emotions of the great majority of picturegoers. It is the human note that makes the picture today. It is that quality of sincerity that makes the drama ring true. Surely the industry has had this proved to them in the past year. The biggest successes have not been the pictures with the biggest sets — but they have been the pictures with the most human stories. Emory Johnson Director) Johnson would continue to thrive as an independent director because he did not just make epic films; he made bankable movies focusing on subjects he and his mother held dear. During his career as a film director, he would direct 13 films, of which 11 were silent and 2 were talkies.

==== Themes ====
What the world needs most today is a better understanding of humanity. What it wants are love and human sympathy. Thus, I have set out to make love the theme of all my productions. I have sought to show how whole families are lifted from sorrow to contentment by love and kindly sediments.

— Emory Johnson
Director,

Like the director's quote, love and devotion are constant themes throughout the third alarm's storyline. Dan McDowell's devotion to his wife and likewise her devotion to him; the couple's everlasting love and willingness to sacrifice for their children; Johnny's love for June; Dr. Rutherford's fatherly love for his daughter; Dan's devotion for the horses in his care; a crippled boy kindness. All of these were carefully blended to complement the tale of our working-class hero and create another Emory Johnson Melodrama. Moviegoers often saw another central theme.

Dan McDowell's plight when he is caught between one of life's passages - too old to be young yet not old enough to be old. Mechanization had taken away the job he loved and changed how he lived. This theme was something so many working class individuals could relate to in the industrial age.

First, he paid homage to the police officers, and now he would honor the firefighters like the Patrick O'Hara character in "In the Name of the Law," this movie portrays firemen as family men trying to balance raising a family with the dangerous profession of firefighting. Johnson felt these working-class heroes did not get the recognition they so richly deserved for their work. Emory Johnson's glorification of public servants would become the perfect subject material for all his F.B.O. Special productions.

==== Screenplay ====
The greatest appeal in pictures is not in extravagant spectacles, historical pageants, or adaptations of fairy tales. I think the straightforward, clean, wholesome Melodrama will always have the choice corner in the hearts of the American public.

— Emilie Johnson
Writer,

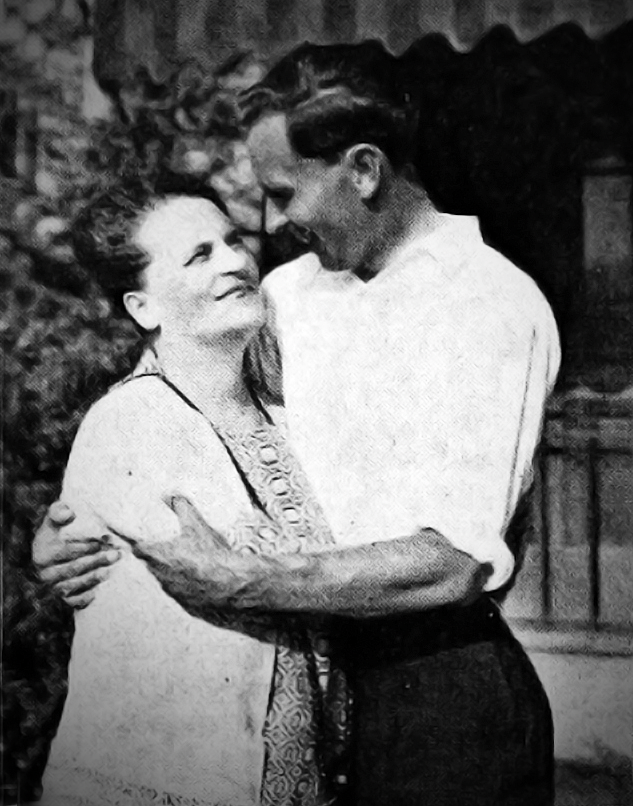
Emilie and Emory

Emilie Johnson was Emory Johnson 's mother. She was born on June 3, 1867, in Gothenburg, Västra Götaland, Sweden. Her only son was born in 1894 - Alfred Emory Johnson.

In the 1920s, Emilie and Emory Johnson developed one of the unique relationships in the annals of Hollywood. The decade saw the mother-son team grow into the most financially successful directing and writing team in motion picture history. Their unique collaboration would persist through the decade, only fading in the early 30s. Such partnerships in Hollywood have been few and far between. She wrote most of the stories and screenplays her son used for his prosperous career directing melodramas.

Emilie discussed The Third Alarm with the newspaper - "When creating The Third Alarm, I took every opportunity to visit the fire department's engine houses, watching the firemen's actions and observing the procedure in answering an alarm. Emory is always with me on these occasions, and we are in consultation daily regarding angles of the story that present themselves as a result of our observations. Together we attend the fire chiefs convention and San Francisco."

=== Filming ===
This movie was filmed on location entirely in Los Angeles, California, and had the complete cooperation of the Los Angeles Fire Department. The LAFD furnished equipment, old-style firefighting apparatus, and large firefighting workforce to assist Emory Johnson in making this movie.

==== Schedule ====
The film schedule according to Camera! "Pulse of the Studios". This schedule traces a film's evolution from Cradle-to-grave. This film started shooting in July 1922 and was In The Can October 1922. The timetable gives the studio and location as — R. C. Picture Corp located at Melrose and Gower.

The section also displayed the column headers and entries for this film:

| Director | Star | Cameraman | Ass't Director | Scenarist | Type | Progress |
|---|---|---|---|---|---|---|
| Emory Johnson | All-Star | Henry Sharp | Dick Rosson | Emilie Johnson | The Discard | See table below |

◆ Weekly progress timetable according Camera! "Pulse of the Studios" ◆
| Year | Month | Day | Progress | Ref |
|---|---|---|---|---|
| 1922 | Jul | 15 | Principal photography started on The Discard | |
| 1922 | Jul | 29 | 2nd thru 3rd week of shooting The Discard | |
| 1922 | Aug | 12 | 4th thru 5th week of shooting. This was the final week of shooting on The Discard. | |
| 1922 | Aug | 19 | Post production 1st week of preparing The Discard | |
| 1922 | Aug | 26 | 1st week of Film editing The Discard | |
| 1922 | Sep | 2 | Work is complete on The Discard | |
| 1922 | Sep | 9 | Listing displays idle with no film title | |
| 1922 | Sep | 16 | The second instance of preparing with no title listed | |
| 1922 | Sep | 23 | 1st week of Editing. New movie title The Third Alarm is shown for the first time | |
| 1922 | Sep | 30 | 2nd week of editing The Third Alarm | |
| 1922 | Oct | 7 | 3rd week of editing. This entry is the final listing for the film titled The Third Alarm | |
| 1922 | Oct | 14 | The Third Alarm drops out of "Pulse of the Studios" on October 14, 1922 | |

==== Working title ====
When films enter production, they need the means to reference the project. A Working title is assigned to the project. A Working Title can also be named an Alternate title. In many cases, a working title will become the release title.
Working titles are used primarily for two reasons:

- An official title for the project has not been determined
- A non-descript title to mask the real reason for making the movie.

The working title for this film is listed as The Discard or The Discard. Filming started on The Discard in July 1922. This time period would coincide with the July 9, 1922, premiere of In the Name of the Law. Based on the Camera! magazine's shooting schedule, the title of the film The Discard was changed to The Third Alarm between September and October 1922.

The title The Discard is sometimes confused with its companion film In the Name of the Law. An alternate title for In the Name of the Law was incorrectly listed on some websites as The Discard.

=== Post production ===
This film is the second production under Emory Johnson's F.B.O. Contract. Johnson would start working on his next film - The West~Bound Limited, in December 1922. That film would feature a train engineer and star Ralph Lewis. In the years to come, Johnson would glorify mail carriers, newspaper press operators, more train engineers, police officers, Army aviators, and members of the US Navy.

==== Music ====
A FIRE LADDIE (Just Like My Daddy)
Rega Dance Orchestra and The New York Fire Dept Quartette

In January 1923, a new Fireman's song by Johnnie Tucker was copyrighted. In April 1923, Okeh Records cut a recording by the Fire Department of New York and Rega Dance Orchestra. The song was composed by Johnnie Tucker with lyrics by Bartley Costello and featured John Stewart, a boy soprano, singing "A fire laddie (just like my daddy)."

The composer, John Tucker, had been an officer of the New York Fire Department for several years. He played both trombone and piano for the Fireman's Quartet, and due to his background, he composed the song for the motion picture The Third Alarm.

== Release and reception ==
Several websites assert the film's first showing was in Cleveland, Ohio, on December 25, 1922. These references are based on American Film Institute listing and confirmed by a movie advertisement in the Cleveland's The Plain Dealer. Other references state the promotional materials for the film wouldn't be ready until the first week in January 1923.

On December 31, 1922, the film was copyrighted to R-C (Robertson-Cole) Pictures Corp with the registration number LP18553. The FBO Film copyrights were registered with original British owners. FBO was the official name of the film distributing operation for Robertson-Cole Pictures Corp. Joseph P. Kennedy Sr. would clear this up later

=== New York premiere ===
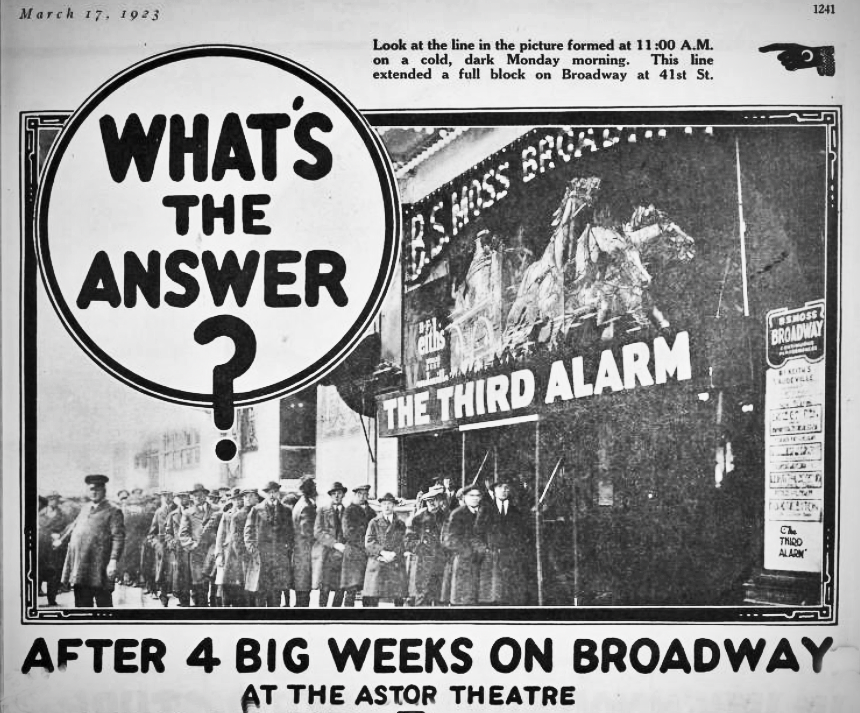
The Third Alarm at the BS Moss Theatre in N.Y.C.

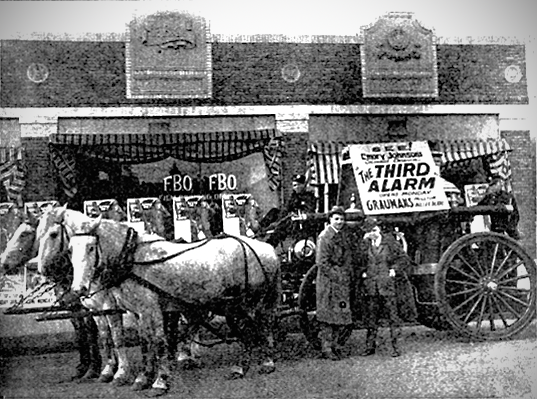
Emory Johnson and Hyatt Daab with fire team that exploited "The Third Alarm" at Grauman" s Los Angeles.

Film Booking Offices of America booked The Third Alarm into prestigious 1,131 seats Astor Theatre in New York City for a four-week run starting on Sunday, January 7, 1923. This was a considerable investment for F.B.O. This "Theatrical Rental Arrangement" cost F.B.O. $6,000 (equivalent to $115,408 in 2025) a week to rent the theatre.

According to Variety, ticket prices for the Astor performances ranged from $1.00 for matinee and $1.50 for evenings (Normal prices for the Astor). The magazine also observed the four-week run was generally a success. The first week generated $7,800, "including a tie-up with the fire department for the pension fund." For the third week, Variety stated - "Not pulling, but being run for the advertising that it gets." The last week, the magazine stated, "Forth, and final week, the picture just got by, doing something less than the general expense of the house and advertising, little under $5,000. F.B.O. presented a more nuanced view of the New York run touting the run as a resounding success.

==== Grauman Los Angeles ====
On Monday, January 29, 1923, a Los Angeles Fire Department engine clanged up and down the thoroughfares, finally stopping at Sid Grauman Million Dollar Theater on Broadway. The theater had a capacity of 2,345 seats. The people following the engine soon discovered the advertising ploy was directing people to watch the movie house's latest feature – The Third Alarm. Sid Grauman had rented the blockbuster film for two weeks. The fire engine stunt would be used effectively nationwide to advertise the movie, always with the local fire department's full cooperation. The promotional photograph on the right shows Emory Johnson supporting his film showing at the Sid Grauman Million Dollar Theater in Los Angeles.

The film then continued to be shown in theaters across the country. Of the hundreds of moviehouse reviews published in the film magazines of the time, one can hardly find a negative review.

=== Official release ===
The film was officially released on January 7, 1923, by Film Booking Offices of America.

=== Advertising ===
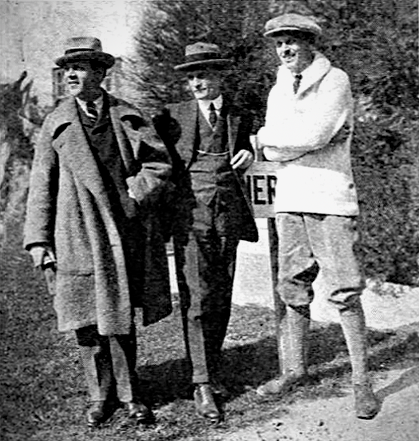
Emory Johnson, director, H.C.Reinke. St Joseph Mo owner of theatres in the middle west and Johnie Walker

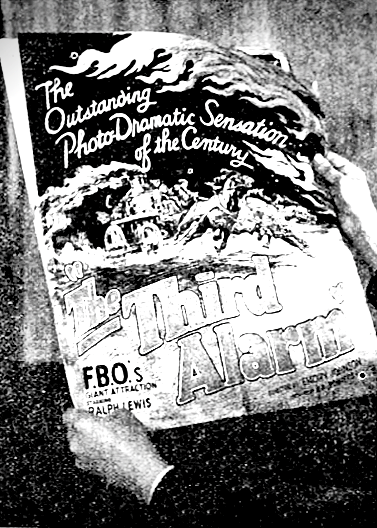
Campaign book for The Third Alarm 1922

In August 1922, a convention of the International Association of Fire Engineers was held in San Francisco. During the convention, the fire chiefs were introduced to director Emory Johnson and his wife, Ella Hall. Emory and Ella were promoting a new film titled The Third Alarm. The film was still being edited, but Emory Johnson could show two reels of the movie to assembled chiefs. The chiefs were impressed with the film's accuracy in depicting firefighting techniques. This was the first promotion of the film four months before the release date. F.B.O. implemented the same advertising strategy they used in promoting In the Name of the Law. Before this film was released, FBO stated it had 100 letters from fire chiefs around the country. The chiefs said they would fully support the showing of this film in their cities.

In the world of film, the word exploitation has devious connotations. However, a vast difference exists between an Exploitation film and exploiting a film. In the 1920s, the F.B.O. concept of film exploitation meant creating local tie-ins with the particular working-class or public servants portrayed in the film. In the case of The Third Alarm, it meant establishing contact with the fire department in the local venue before the film arrived in the city. An F.B.O. agent, if available, and the theater owner would work hand-in-hand in developing an exploitation strategy for the film. This usually meant developing a relationship with the local fire chief. In turn, the chief would realize the benefits of promoting the movie and record his endorsement. This support could include the chiefs speaking to local newspapers and providing fire equipment to attract paying patrons to the movie theater.

Many local Fire departments gave the movie free advertising by staging various displays. A typical example of this promotion is dusting off old firefighting apparatuses, hitching up horses and clamoring down the street, bells clanging, and ending at the local theater. Small crowds might follow the equipment to the theater, hoping to glimpse the fire. Other stunts might include parking old museum pieces in front of the theater, appreciation parades, and women jumping off buildings. Anything was fair game if it drew potential movie ticket purchasers to the work of local firefighters and built up a need to see them in action on the silver screen. Another strategy to get the firefighters on board with the advertising was to donate a portion of each ticket price to the fireman's pension fund. This was the same scheme used in In The Name of the Law.

If the theater owners had questions about exploiting this movie, FBO would provide a 22-page newspaper-size campaign book. (See the Campaign book pictured above) As the article stated, hundreds of these were mailed out while the movie was still premiering at the Astor Theatre.

=== Reviews ===
Movie reviews were essential perspectives for theater owners and fans. Reviews of movies printed in various trade magazines were indispensable in deciding whether to book or watch the film. When critics had contrasting reviews, choosing whether to see or book the movie can be challenging, especially since discordant reviews do not mean it is necessarily a bad movie. Ultimately, it boiled down to personal choices and how much value you place on the movie review and the reviewer. The movie received positive reviews. Most small-town and large-city venues enjoyed the movie.

Melodrama films have plots appealing to the raised passions of the audience. They concentrate on family issues, direct their attention to a victim's character, and develop the themes of duty and love. The melodramatic format shows the characters working through their struggles with persistence, sacrificial deeds, and courage. Movie critics and theater owners often use the following expressions to describe the movies they are reviewing or showing.
Terms used in reviewing silent movie melodrama

==== Critical response ====
In the January 14, 1923 issue of The Film Daily, the reviewer points out

An almost inexhaustible supply of fine thrills in a picture dedicated to firefighters; sure-fire box office picture of its kind.

There is a very definite box office value in the picture because it supplies a new line of thrills and the sort of action and atmosphere that will certainly make it a popular number with the big majority of picture goers throughout the country

In the January 20, 1923 issue of the Exhibitors Trade Review, the reviewer states

A stirring melodrama, replete with heart interest, whirling action, and stark realism, "The Third Alarm" registers as a unique attraction destined to win widespread popularity. That photography is immense goes without saying. The shots of fighting the flames are of quality that entitles the cameraman to unstinted credit, better stuff of its kind has never been screened.

The picture fairly throbs with spectacular views, the brigade swinging with frantic, Furious speed through the streets, fire laddies battling desperately against the devouring elements, the red blaze bursting across surging banks of smoke, walls tottering and crashing....

In the February 1, 1923 issue of the San Antonio Evening News, Mary Carter observes

The Third Alarm is the most thrilling motion picture the writer ever saw. It glorifies and immortalizes the American firemen's noble instincts, shows the American fire department's fine traditions and the dangers of a fireman's life, and bestows everlasting benediction upon the wives and the daughters of firefighters. The faithful fire horses are not forgotten in this amazing and gripping photoplay.

==== Audience response ====
FBO focused on producing and distributing films for small-town venues. They served this market melodramas, non-Western action pictures, and comedic shorts. Unlike major Hollywood studios, FBO owned no movie theaters and depended on movie house proprietors renting their films. Like most independents, FBO depended on the movie house owners to renting their films to show a profit.

Before leasing a film, picture house owners were concerned that the film is a potential moneymaker in their locale. Proprietors would subscribe to trade journals to assist them in making these financial judgments. Movie magazines would show the film's branding, critical reviews and publish other managers' viewpoints, including attendance numbers and revenue.

These are brief published observations from movie house owners.

J.S. Rex, Princess Theatre Wauseon, Ohio, population 8,000

THE THIRD ALARM, with a special cast. - This is the best picture I have ever shown. I could not handle all the people. Ran two days to the largest crowd in the history of theatre.

George K. Zimsz, Harbor Theatre Corpus Christi, Texas, population 10,000

Star, cast. Darn good picture. Patrons went out, saying, "That's what I call a picture." Rotten print, but made it do. Used Fire department Run, usual paper, and lobby. Had fair attendance. Draw all classes. Admission 10-20-30

Harold Frank Mgr, Majestic Colonial Theatre Jackson, Michigan, population 50,000

The Third Alarm opened here today to the biggest weekday business this house has ever known. We've played all the big ones. The crowd stood out till after 9:30 PM Greatest exploitation picture I have ever seen.

=== Box Office ===
Johnson would claim in May 1932, he made "that picture for $40,000 (equivalent to $769,384 in 2025), and it grossed one million two hundred thousand (equivalent to $23,081,511 in 2025)." The film would become the most financially successful movie ever produced in Emory Johnson's career. The movie earned Johnson an estimated $275,000 (equivalent to $5,289,513 in 2025).

=== Accolades ===
In the Film Year Book 1922-23 (The 1922-23 Film Daily Year Book of Motion Pictures) The Third Alarm is named one of "The Forty Best Pictures of the Year" as "Selected by the National Board of Review of Motion Pictures, from productions reviewed from December 1921 to December 1922."

== Preservation status ==
The majority of silent films did not survive. (Note: With every foot of film that is lost, we lose a link to our culture, to the world around us, to each other, and ourselves – Martin Scorsese, filmmaker A report by Library of Congress film historian and archivist David Pierce estimates that: around 75% of original silent-era films have perished; 14% of the 10,919 silent films released by major studios exist in their original 35 mm or other formats; 11% survive only in full-length foreign versions or film formats of lesser image quality.; Many silent-era films did not survive for reasons as explained on this Wikipedia page.)

According to the Library of Congress website, this film has a status of - "incomplete copies of this film exist in Gosfilmofond of Russia Moscow, UCLA Film & Television Archive Los Angeles." (Note: Complete copy of the Library of Congress copyright record Title = The Third Alarm [motion picture] Director = Johnson, Emory Dates Issued = December 31, 1922 Physical Description = 7 reels; 6,700 ft. Copyright Claimant = Emory Johnson Productions Registration number = Lp18553 Studio = R-C/FBO Holdings = U.S. Archive Completeness = incomplete Completeness = abridgement Format = 16 mm: Usl Record No = 38409 Archive = Gosfilmofond Of Russia (Moscow) [Rur], UCLA Film And Television Archive (Los Angeles) [Usl]) Other web sites claim complete copies exist at the UCLA Film & Television Archive in Los Angeles.

John Reid states in his book: "By cobbling together the best footage from multiple 16mm prints", a restoration service assembled a tinted presentation of the film." He also claims, "sources differ as to whether the original theatrical version had six or seven reels." This five-reel version is now available on DVD . . . " Reid also discusses the controversy regarding the length of the film's original theatrical release.

The Library of Congress's publication - Catalog of Copyright Entries, shows two entries:

- THE THIRD ALARM. Released thru Film Booking Offices of America 1922 6 reels copyright R-C Pictures Corp.; December 31, 1922 LP18553
- THE THIRD ALARM. 1930 7 reels, copyrighted Tiffany Productions, Inc.; November 28, 1930 LP1775

The Performing Arts Database of the Library of Congress states - 7 reels; 6.700 ft. as does the "AFI CATALOG OF FEATURE FILMS." The restored versions available on YouTube run between 57 – 59 minutes, i.e., approximately five reels (11 minutes per reel). Thus, the restored versions are missing minutes in the film's original theatrical release. The exact time difference between the initial release and the restored version is lost to time, but the main story points have survived.

The restored film is in the public domain and available on YouTube. The film is also available on DVD and is widely available from multiple vendors.

== Gallery ==
=== Principal players, director, stills and ads ===
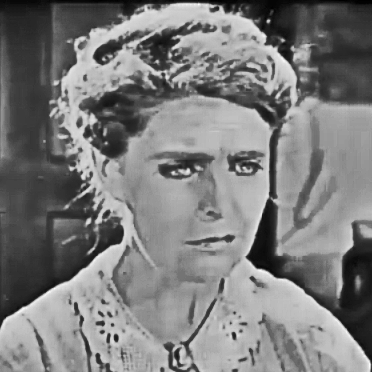
Virginia True Boardman
Mother McDowell

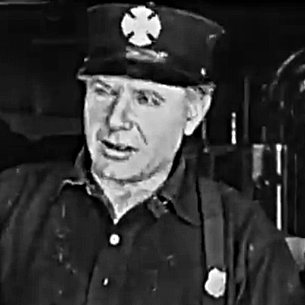
Ralph Lewis
Dan McDowell

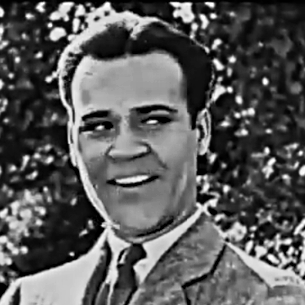
Johnnie Walker
Johnny McDowell

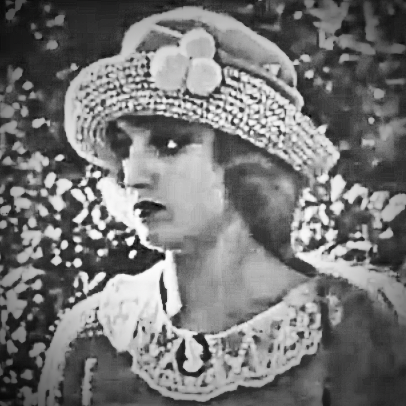
Ella Hall
June Rutherford

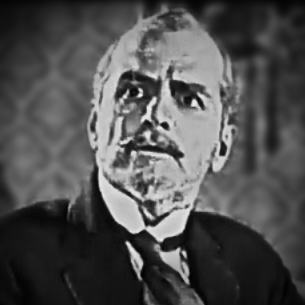
Richard Morris
Dr. Rutherford

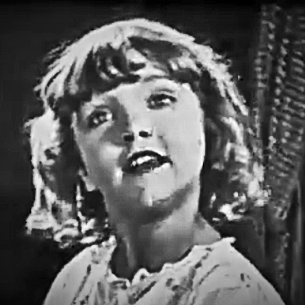
Josephine Adair
Alice McDowell

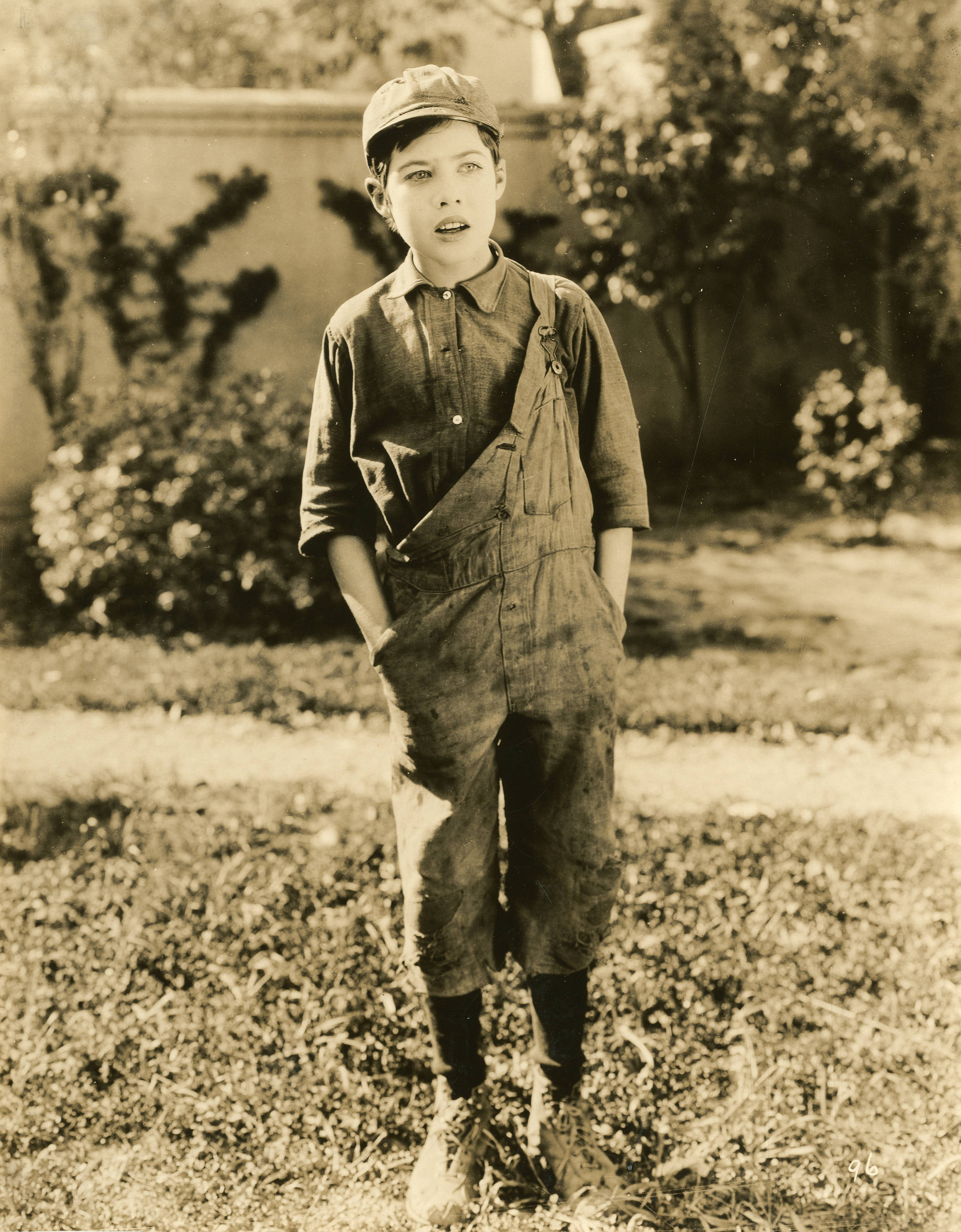
Frankie Lee
Little Jimmie

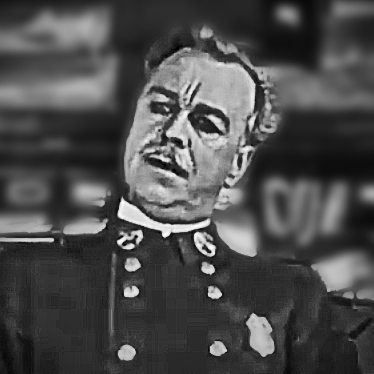
Wilbur Higby
Fire Chief Andrews

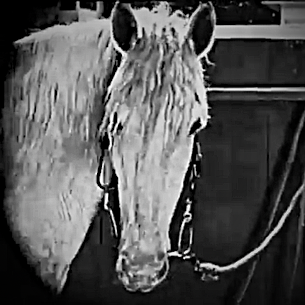
Bullet
The fire horse

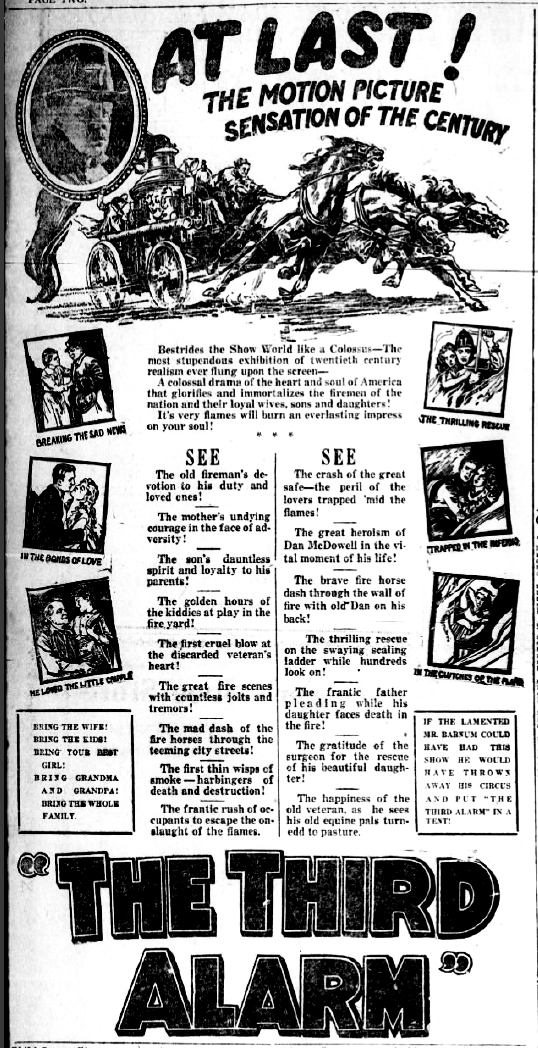
The Third Alarm
Lobby Card

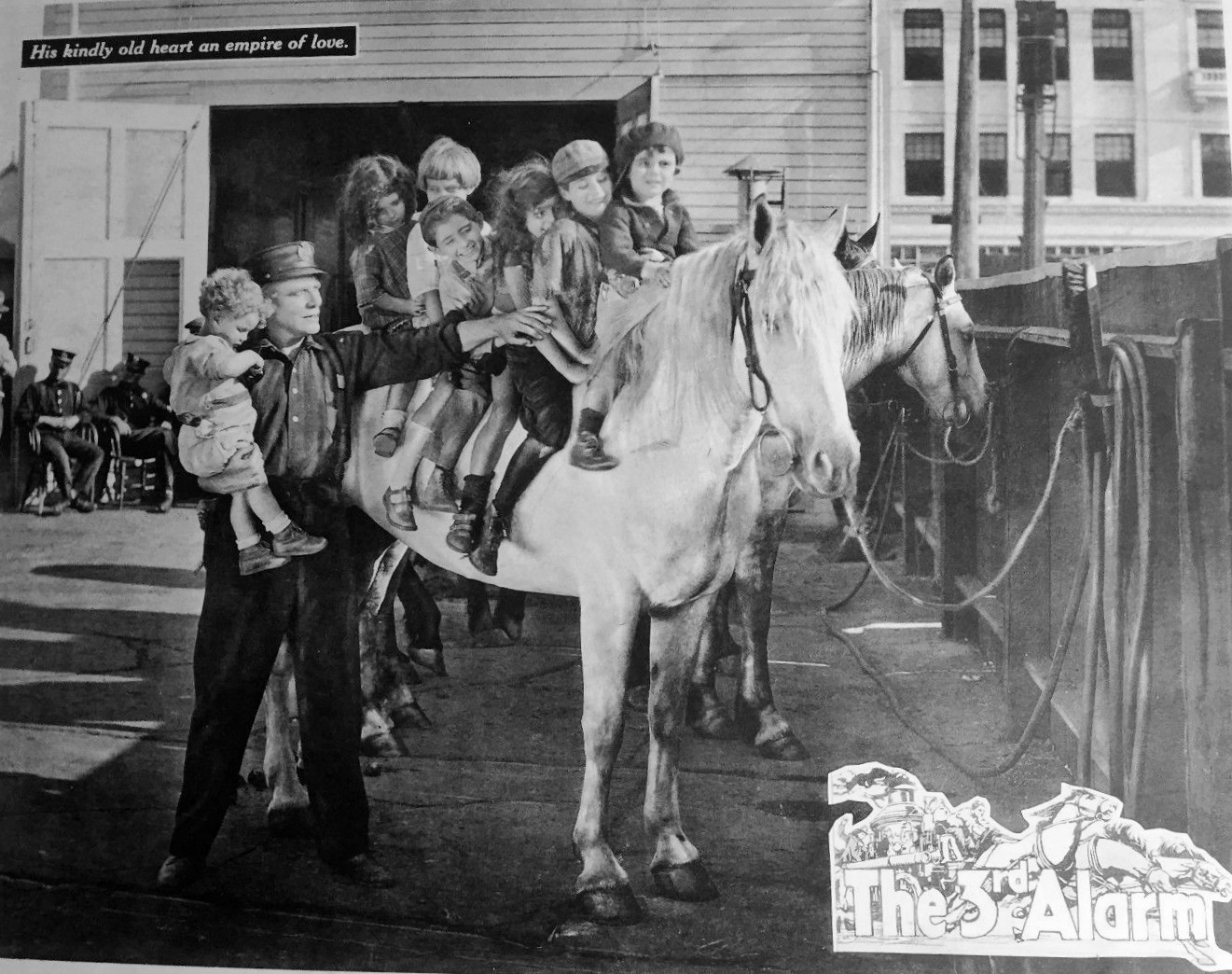
The Third Alarm
Lobby Card

== See also ==
- Glossary of firefighting equipment
- List of firefighting mnemonics
- List of American films of 1922

== Bibliography ==
- Katchmer, George A. (2002). A Biographical Dictionary of Silent Film Western Actors and Actresses. Jefferson, North Carolina: McFarland & Company, Inc. ISBN 978-0-7864-4693-3.
- Lasky, Betty (1984). RKO The Biggest Little Major of Them All. Englewood Cliffs, NJ: Prentice-Hall. p. 14. ISBN 0-13-781451-8.
- Slide, Anthony (2000). Nitrate Won't Wait: History of Film Preservation in the United States. McFarland. p. 5. ISBN 978-0786408368. "It is often claimed that 75 percent of all American silent films are gone and 50 percent of all films made prior to 1950 are lost, but such figures, as archivists admit in private, were thought up on the spur of the moment, without statistical information to back them up."
- Reid, John Howard (2015). Silent Movies Plus! More Silent Films & Early Talkies on DVD. Lulu.com. p. 203. ISBN 978-1-329-41424-2.
- Limbacher, J.L. (1977). Feature Films on 8mm and 16mm: A Directory of Feature Films Available for Rental, Sale, and Lease in the United States and Canada, with Serials and Directors' Indexes. Bowker. ISBN 978-0-8352-0919-9. "Brief listings of feature motion pictures available in non-theatrical reduction prints in 1973"
- Laird, Ross; Rust, Brian (2004). Discography of OKeh Records, 1918-1934. Greenwood Publishing Group. p. 230. ISBN 978-0-313-31142-0.

== American Film Institute cast links ==
- Ralph Lewis
- Johnny Walker
- Ella Hall
- Virginia TrueBoardman
- Frankie Lee
- Wilbur Higby
- Richard Morris
- Josephine Adair
- Emory Johnson
- Emilie Johnson
