= The Mailman (1923 film) =

1923 American silent melodrama film

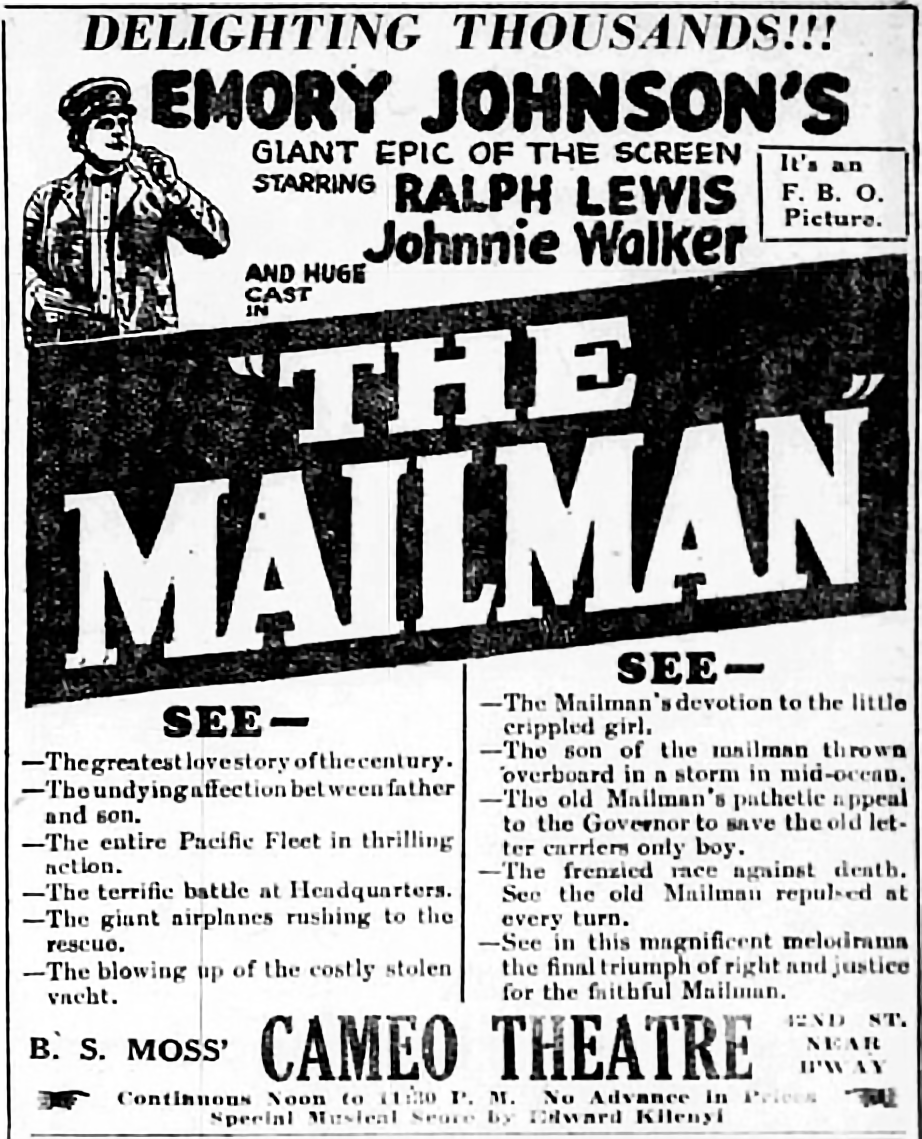
- Newspaper advertisement
- Directed by: Emory Johnson; Asst Dir John G. Blystone
- Written by: Emilie Johnson; Story and Screenplay
- Produced by: Pat Powers; Emory Johnson
- Starring: Ralph Lewis; Johnnie Walker; Virginia True Boardman
- Cinematography: Ross Fischer
- Distributed by: FBO
- Release date: December 9, 1923
- Running time: 7 reels 7,160 feet
- Country: United States
- Languages: Silent film; English intertitles

The Mailman is a 1923 American silent melodrama directed by Emory Johnson. FBO released the film in December 1923. The film's "All-Star" cast included Ralph Lewis, Johnnie Walker, and Virginia True Boardman. Emilie Johnson, Johnson's mother, wrote both the story and screenplay. The Mailman was the fourth film in Johnson's eight-picture contract with FBO.

The U. S. Mail Service honors Bob Morley (Ralph Lewis) and his son Johnnie (Johnnie Walker) for their many years of service. Afterward, Johnnie is promoted to an officer on the U. S. Mail Service ship — Enterprise. The craft transports registered mail and other valuable cargo. While Johnnie is on duty, thieves rob the boat and gun down the supervisor. Through a series of unfortunate events, they charge Johnnie with theft and murder. Since he has no alibi, the court finds him guilty of both crimes. When the court is about to pass a sentence, the actual wrongdoer confesses and saves Johnnie from his date with the hangman's noose.

== Plot ==
The film's opening scene starts with a ceremony. A celebration acknowledges Bob and Johnnie's years of devoted service as mail carriers. Bob is a proud father who has raised his son to value hard work and dedication to their job. It is also clear that they have earned the respect and admiration of their colleagues and the community.

The story takes a dramatic turn when Johnnie accepts a promotion to serve on a postal ship, the Enterprise. The vessel transports the Post Office's registered mail. Johnnie accepts the job and starts work immediately. A robbery occurs one night while he is working on the postal ship. A postal officer is shot during the heist, and Johnnie is the only witness. The criminals decide they must do away with Johnnie and throw him overboard. In a twist of fate, a yacht in the same area saves Johnnie from drowning. It is of little comfort when Johnnie discovers the boat is a rumrunner and is involved in the Enterprise's robbery.

The yacht's owners discover Johnnie had witnessed the robbery and murder. Before they can toss him back into the sea, Johnnie escapes to the ship's radio room and transmits an alert to the Pacific fleet. Johnnie shows his courage and dedication to justice, despite his impending danger. After identifying the yacht's location, the fleet commander mobilizes his forces to intercept the 90-foot boat. There is a subsequent pursuit and destruction of the bootlegging vessel by ten Pacific Fleet Dreadnoughts.

During the melee, Johnnie saves himself from the destruction. Once aboard the rescue ship, they arrest him for committing robbery and murder. His new ordeal starts, and he faces trial for killing a government postal officer during the robbery. Bob Morley frantically calls everyone he knows, begging for help to save his son. Despite Bob's pleas, the court found Johnnie guilty of murder and sentenced him to hang.

While awaiting his execution, the actual criminal confesses. Johnnie is exonerated, and father and son are reunited. The movie ends on a happy note.

== Cast ==
Actor	Role
Ralph Lewis	Bob Morley
Johnnie Walker	Johnnie
Martha Sleeper	Betty
Virginia True Boardman	Mrs. Morley
Taylor Graves	Harry
Hardee Kirkland	Captain Franz
David Kirby	Jack Morgan
Josephine Adair	Virginia
Rosemary Cooper	Mrs. Thompson
Richard Morris	Admiral Fleming

== Production ==
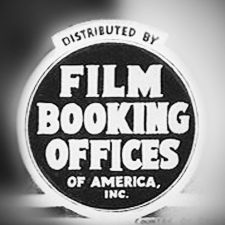
FBO logo

Melodrama is our meat - but it's high-class melodrama. It allowed the public to weep and sympathize with the handsome hero and the beautiful heroine. We don't want to label our pictures, we must make pictures that appeal to all.

— Joe Kennedy
Member FBO board of directors,

Film Booking Offices of America (FBO) was an energetic, independent American silent era film studio. The company released around 110 features and shorts a year. The company focused on producing low-budget films emphasizing first-class westerns, action films, romantic melodramas, and comedy shorts. The company mainly distributed its pictures to small-town venues and independent theater chains, which changed their pictures three times a week. FBO would make their pictures appeal to every member of the American family.

The average cost per FBO production was $50,000 to $75,000 equivalent to $961,730 to $1,442,594 in 2021 compared to the Major film studios which could spend five times as much to produce a movie.

FBO also produced and distributed a limited number of big-budget features labeled "Gold Bond" or "Special" productions. Emory Johnson's eight films for FBO were all specials.

In 1923, Emilie and Emory Johnson signed a contract extension with FBO. The contract was for 2 1/2 years. The agreement stipulated Emory was to make eight attractions for FBO. The agreement specified that his previous four films would count toward the total. FBO also agreed to invest two and a half million dollars (In today's money – equivalent to $40,472,167 in 2021) on the remaining four films. Another part of the new contract stipulated – "The contract also provides that Emory Johnson's mother, Mrs. Emilie Johnson, shall prepare all of the stories and write all the scripts for the Johnson attractions in addition to assisting her son in filming the productions."

"Between the 1922 reorganization of Film Booking Office of America and October 1923, Pat Powers, as one of the company's new American investors, was effectively in command. Powers changed the name of Robertson-Cole/FBO to the Powers Studio for a brief period, though there is no record of the company ever having produced or released a film under that banner." Powers resigned from F.B.O. on October 30, 1923.

=== Pre production ===
==== Development ====
Previously, Johnson's capitalized on the large working base of Police Officers, Firefighters, and railroad workers. On this occasion, he set his sights on postal workers. In 1922, the United States Post Office had 339,000 employees in America. The Bureau of Information of the Post Office Department is said to have 52,000 postmasters throughout the country. Those sorts of numbers would provide much free advertising.

Johnson and his mother were meticulous in their research or preproduction of these films. They consistently portrayed their lead characters in roles that showed their loyalty and dedication to the organization they served. A significant part of Emory Johnson's success in these films was that he coordinated his movies with huge entities, like police departments, firefighting units, railroads, and railroad yards. This time, he recruited the cooperation of the United States Postal Service and the US Navy. Ralph Lewis was the perfect lead for all these films about working wage earners.

==== Casting ====
- Ralph Lewis (1872–1931) was born on October 8, 1872, in Englewood, Illinois. The 50 year-old actor would land his fourth starring role in an Emory Johnson production as Bob Morley, a working-class mailman. He previously had featured roles in Johnson's past three FBO vehicles – In the Name of the Law, The Third Alarm and The West~Bound Limited. Lewis would later get another starring role in Johnson's seventh film for FBO – The Last Edition, released in November 1925. The Last Edition was Lewis's fifth and final film in an Emory Johnson production.
  Lewis's film debut came in 1911. Lewis appeared in 160 films between 1912 and 1938. Lewis will always be remembered for his role as abolitionist U.S. Representative Austin Stoneman in D. W. Griffith's The Birth of a Nation (1915) and the governor in Intolerance (1916). The July 14, 1923, issue of Camera! noted: One of Ralph Lewis' first screen portrayals under the direction of D. W. Griffith thirteen years ago was that of a United States mail carrier in the old Biograph one-reel drama, "The Mystery Letter." (Note: A 1924 article in Camera! noted: Ralph Lewis, since starting his career in motion pictures with D. W. Griffith at the old Biograph company thirteen years ago, has played in one hundred and fourteen screen dramas, ranging from the split-reelers put out by the Biograph and including the big Griffith special twelve-reel features like "Intolerance" and "The Birth of a Nation. He has played the role of a judge seven times, a politician ten times, a police officer three times, and has portrayed a ship captain twice. He has committed twenty-seven murders and incidentally was himself killed thirty times. Lewis has been before the camera in twenty-two deathbed scenes. He has fought numerous duels and has gone down with sinking boats on three occasions. He has played father to almost all of the big screen stars, including Mary Pickford, Norma and Constance Talmadge, Alice Terry, Lillian Gish, and many others. However, he has never played the role of a farmer.) The June 5, 1923, edition of the Poughkeepsie Eagle-News observed: "Ralph Lewis, is especially good in parts built upon strength of character ..."
- Johnnie Walker (1894–1949) was born on January 7, 1894, in New York City, New York. He was an established star when the 29 year-old actor played Johnie Morley, Bob Morley's son. He previously had featured roles in Johnson's FBO vehicles – In the Name of the Law, and The Third Alarm where he played Ralph Lewis character's son in both films. John Harron replaced Walker in the April 1923 production of The West~Bound Limited, but Walker reappeared in this film in his favored role of Ralph Lewis's son. Walker would later be featured in Johnson's sixth film for FBO – Life's Greatest Game, released in October 1924.Life's Greatest Game was Walker's fifth and final role in an Emory Johnson production. Johnnie Walker appeared in five Emory Johnson FBO productions. He played the son of the film's leading father figure in each film. In each of Walker's supporting roles, the character was named Johnnie or a derivative. (Note: Johnnie Connections: The 1922 film In the Name of the Law Ralph Lewis played Patrick O'Hara and Walker played Johnnie O'Hara; The 1922 film The Third Alarm Ralph Lewis played Dan McDowell and Walker played Johnny McDowell; The 1923 film The Mailman Ralph Lewis played Bob Morley and Walker played Johnnie Morley; The 1924 film The Spirit of the USA Carl Stockdale played Thomas Gains and Walker played Johnnie Gains; The 1924 film Life's Greatest Game Tom Santschi player Jack Donovan and Walker player Jackie Donovan Jr.; He also would have played Ralph Lewis's son, Johnny Buckley in the movie The West~Bound Limited, except he was involved in filming The Fourth Musketeer.)
  Walker is five feet eleven inches tall, with black hair and blue eyes. AFI credits the actor with 48 Titles in his Filmography.
- Martha Sleeper (1910–1983) was born on June 24, 1910, in Lake Bluff, Illinois. The 12 year-old actress played Johnnie's kid sister—Betty Morley. This role would be her first appearance on the silver screen. Martha Sleeper was discovered by Emory Johnson before the shooting started in 1923. (Note: The following article appeared in the San Francisco Examiner on October 23, 1933: Some actresses, crash motion, picture gates, by mean force. Others accomplish the miracle by strategy. Martha Sleeper gained admission by the simple expedient of leaving her photograph in a vacated home. The house in question, owned by the Sleepers in Hollywood, was sold by a real estate agent to the mother of Emery Johnson, picture, Director, where Miss Sleeper's photograph was found.) Although it should be pointed out, Sleeper was not just some chance discovery in a forgotten photo. She had an entertainment pedigree. Her father, mother, and uncle were in the entertainment business. After this role, she would appear comedies. In 1927, Sleeper was one of 13 actresses selected as a WAMPAS Baby Star i.e.one of the year's feminine personalities whom exhibitors thought had a promising future in feature films. She would remain active in the movie industry and Broadway between 1923 and 1945. After her entertainment career, she would rediscover herself and become a fashion icon.
- Virginia True Boardman (1889–1971) was born Margaret Shields on May 23, 1889, in Fort Davis, Texas. She was 34 when she played mother Morley. This was her second role in an Emory Johnson production. She previously had appeared in The Third Alarm playing Ralph Lewis's wife - mother McDowell. Boardman began her theatrical career in 1906 and would continue to appear in 52 films between 1911 and 1936.
- David (Red) Kirby (1880–1954) was born in St. Louis, Missouri, on July 16, 1880. He was an established star when the 44 year-old actor played one of the two heavies Jack Morgan. He had acted in hundreds of movies by the time this movie was produced. David was five feet eleven inches tall, with brown hair and brown eyes. AFI credits the actor/director with 33 Titles in Filmography.
- Richard Morris (1862–1924) was born on January 30, 1862, in Charlestown, Massachusetts. The 61 year-old actor played Admiral Fleming. Morris had previously acted in In the Name of the Law and The Third Alarm. He would appear in a future Johnson production The Spirit of the USA before his untimely death in October 1924.
- Hardee Kirkland (1868–1929) was born on May 23, 1868, in Savannah, Georgia. The 55 year-old actor acted in the other heavie role of Captain Franz. Kirkland was active in the industry between 1912 – 1925 making 40 films. He would die in Los Angeles, California six years after making this film. Kirkland was also the son of former Confederate Brigadier General William Whedbee Kirkland.
- Josephine Adair (1921–1966) was born on June 27, 1916, in Lamar, Colorado. Adair was 6 when she started acting in the role of Virginia. She had previously appeared in the Emory Johnson productions of In the Name of the Law and The Third Alarm. This would be her final performance in a Johnson production. Josephine Adair was the younger sister of another child actress, Elizabeth Adair.

==== Director ====
Emory Johnson was a former actor turned director when he directed this film. He had acted in 73 movies between 1913 and 1922 for the likes of Essanay, Universal, Pathé, and Goldwyn before FBO allowed him to direct his first film.

Johnson was 29 years old when he directed this film. The Mailman was the fourth film in Emory Johnson's eight-picture contract with FBO. His three previous FBO films had all been financially successful – In the Name of the Law, The Third Alarm, and The West~Bound Limited.

Johnson began his acting career in 1912. He secured work as an extra in early Broncho Billy Westerns. He acted in 73 movies between 1912 and 1922 for the likes of Essanay, Universal, Pathé, and Goldwyn. In 1921, he thought the time was right to start directing movies. Before FBO even considered allowing a neophyte to direct his first film, Johnson had to convince them to finance a non-comedic movie about police officers. FBO was afraid the public would not like the serious side of cops, especially as a full-length movie. He finally convinced them and completed his film. The movie was a financial success.

During his career at FBO, he would earn titles like the Master of Melodrama, King of Exploitation, and Hero of the Working Class. They would include this drama in all the categories. (Note: We have come to the day when the public is demanding consistent, human stories. We do not believe that the American people want to see only pictures of the ultra-rich. Our characters in The Midnight Call are simple folk — belonging to the great American middle class. The drama and comedy of their lives will reflect the emotions of the great majority of picturegoers. It is the human note that makes the picture today. It is that quality of sincerity that makes the drama ring true. Surely the industry has had this proved to them in the past year. The biggest successes have not been the pictures with the biggest sets — but they have been the pictures with the most human stories. Emory Johnson Director) Johnson would continue to thrive as an independent director because he did not just make epic films; he made bankable movies focusing on subjects he and his mother held dear.

==== Themes ====
What the world needs most today is a better understanding of humanity. What it wants are love and human sympathy. Thus, I have set out to make love the theme of all my productions. I have sought to show how whole families are lifted from sorrow to contentment by love and kindly sediments.

— Emory Johnson
Director,

Emory Johnson's glorification of public servants had become the perfect theme for all his FBO Special productions. Johnson felt these working-class heroes did not get the recognition they so richly deserved for their work. This movie would persist in the same vein as former films and praised government personnel like police, firefighters, and railway engineers. While the movies revolved around the average Joe, Johnson and his mother also needed to balance an action film and a sentimental story for female viewers.

"Love, the greatest of human emotions," is the central theme of Emory Johnson's drama, The Mailman. (Note: What Is a Theme in Movies? "A theme is the film's central, unifying concept. A theme evokes a universal human experience and can be stated in one word or short phrase (for example, "love", "death", or "coming of age"). The theme may never be stated explicitly, but it is exemplified by the film's plot, dialogue, cinematography, and music.") According to Johnson, all of his working-class melodramas revolved around one main theme: love.

Bravery, love, morality, obligation, sacrifice, and tenacity frequently re-appear as themes in the film and become the essence of the movie. The Johnson's blended these elements to complement the tale of our working-class hero.

Like his previous productions, Johnson primarily focused on the bond between father and son. These films featured a mature father, a mother figure, a devoted son, a beautiful young female lead, and a sprinkling of child actors. The son would eventually marry the feminine lead and live happily ever after. These films were also fitting of the new era. The new fandom attending movies sought family-oriented cinema, action films, and films with intelligent plots.

==== Screenplay ====
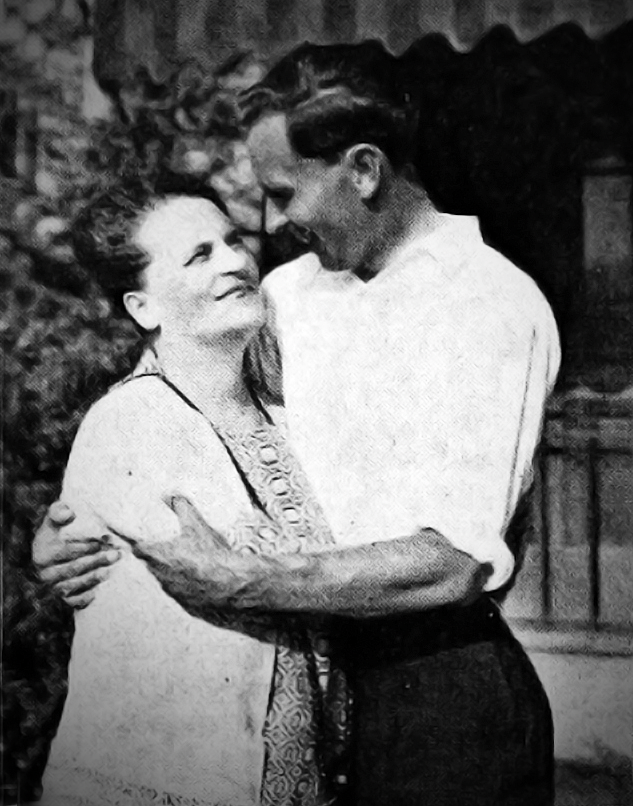
Emilie and Emory

The greatest appeal in pictures is not in extravagant spectacles, historical pageants, or adaptations of fairy tales. I think the straightforward, clean, wholesome Melodrama will always have the choice corner in the hearts of the American public.

— Writer Emilie Johnson,

Emilie Johnson (1867–1941) was born on June 3, 1867, in Gothenburg, Västra Götaland, Sweden. After emigrating to America, she married Alfred Jönsson. Their only son was born in 1894 – actor, director and writer Alfred Emory Johnson. Johnson was 56 years old when she wrote the story and the screen adaptation for this film. The Mailman was the fourth film in the 8-picture FBO contract. Emilie Johnson penned most of the stories and screenplays her son, Emory Johnson, used for his successful career directing epic melodramas. Mrs. Johnson supplied her son with stories that seemed custom-tailored for actor Ralph Lewis. (Note: Emory Johnson said the following about his mother: My mother, Mrs. Emily Johnson, has that invaluable ability to cram human emotions into a photoplay. She has the ripened, matured viewpoint of the average mother. Sometimes I think mothers would make the greatest of all scenario writers because they have a particular human slant on life. Women are as well equipped as men to take up the important work of writing for the screen is already established by the success of many women writers who have fashioned their stories directly for the screen. The average woman has a deep and well-rounded understanding of life. She has little human qualities developed to a far greater degree than the average man.)

In the 1920s, Emilie and Emory Johnson developed one of the unique collaborations in the annals of Hollywood. Emilie Johnson and her son became famous as Hollywood's only mother-son writing/directing team. They usually worked side by side before production started and then on the movie sets after filming began. Emilie Johnson wrote stories about lunch pail characters living paycheck-to-paycheck like law enforcement officers, firefighters, mail carriers, railroad engineers, patriots, baseball players, and newspaper press operators. The Johnson team felt their human-interest stories would be relatable on the silver screen, and her son brought them to the screen in epic melodramas.

Their unique collaboration would persist through the decade, only fading in the early 30s.

=== Filming ===
According to the American Film Institute catalog, this movie was filmed in Hollywood, California, and San Francisco, California.

==== Schedule ====
The film schedule according to Camera! "Pulse of the Studios". This schedule traces a film's evolution from Cradle-to-grave. This film start shooting in July 1922 and was "In the Can" October 1922. The timetable gives the studio and location as — R. C. Picture Corp located at Melrose and Gower.

The table also displayed the following column headers and entries for this film:

Director	Star	Cameraman	Ass't Director	Scenarist	Type
Emory Johnson	Ralph Lewis	R. Fisher	Blystone	Emilie Johnson	The Mail Man

◆ Shooting Schedule according Camera! "Pulse of the Studios" ◆
Year	Month	Day	Progress	Ref
1923	May	19	"Ralph Lewis will shortly begin work on Emory Johnson's latest F. B. O. Production, the title of which is as yet undecided. The story is from the pen of Mrs. Emilie Johnson, the producer's mother, and narrates a mail man's romance and home life."	
1923	Jun	16	"A picture-making outfit, headed by Emory Johnson, arrived in San Francisco last Friday with the battleships of the Pacific Fleet, ... the camera persons had the cooperation of all the naval officers and the use of the searchlights of the battleships, they obtained some of the most remarkable pictures, both day and night, ever taken of a naval fleet in motion. The picture-making party consisted of Emory Johnson (Director), B. F. Miller, Richard Morris (role of Admiral Fleming), and Ross Fisher (Cinematography)."	
1923	Jun	10–15	"Ralph Lewis has returned from Chicago, where he went to spend a few days with his father who was critically ill. His father, Capt. E. R. Lewis died within a few hours of the arrival of his son. Lewis remained in Chicago and arranged the funeral ceremony. Work on Lewis' next FBO. production "The Mailman," under the direction of Emory Johnson, was delayed during his absence."	
1923	Jun	25	1st thru 2nd week of shooting exteriors for The Mail Man.	
1923	Jun	30	"Emory Johnson's next for F. B. 0. is now in production, and has been given the title. The Mailman. Ralph Lewis, star of the previous Johnson productions, will also have the leading role in this one. The picture revolves around the mail carrier. Initial scenes are now being made aboard the battleships of the Pacific Fleet, off San Pedro, through the courtesy of Admiral E. W. Eberle of the U. S. Navy." The working title of The Mail Man" was changed to a production title of The Mailman."	
1923	Jul	2–30	3rd — 7th week of shooting exteriors for The Mail Man.	
1923	Aug	6	1st week of editing The Mail Man	
1923	Aug	13	The Mail Man is no longer listed in "Pulse of the Studios"	
1923	Sep	15	"Having finished filming The Mail Man, at the Pat Powers studio, EmoryJohnson has begun to personally supervise the cutting of the picture which is slated for late autumn release by Film Booking Offices."	
1923	Oct	14–20	First preview of The Mail Man in Los Angeles	
1923	Nov	1	"The Mailman premiered in Washington, D.C., and Philadelphia on November 1, 1923. The premiere in Washington was at the Ambassador Theatre. Later in the day, a private showing was presented for the new Postmaster General Harry New and his staff. In Philadelphia, the premiere was held at Ed Fay's Knickerbocker Theatre. 2,900 fans were in attendance." This is another instance of the movie referred to as The Mailman	
1923	Nov	17	"The Emory Johnson's production, The Mailman, dramatizing the lives of United States, postal workers had its world premiere Saturday, November 17 at Lowes State Theater, Los Angeles. The opening was a gala occasion, the mail workers band of 60 pieces serenaded the Postmaster of the city P.P. O'Brien and other notables."	
1923	Nov	25	"The Mailman," Emory Johnson's latest F.B.O. special will open an indefinite run at the New York Cameo Theatre on November 25, 1923."	

==== Working title ====
When films enter production, they need the means to reference the project. A Working title is assigned to the project. A Working Title can also be named an Alternate title. In many cases, a working title will become the release title.
Working titles are used primarily for two reasons:

- An official title for the project has not been determined
- A non-descript title to mask the real reason for making the movie.

The working title for this film was - The Mail Man.

=== Post production ===
Post-production is a crucial step in filmmaking, transforming the raw footage into the finished product. It requires skilled professionals working together to create a film that meets the director's vision and engages audiences.

The movie theater release of this film comprised 7 reels or roughly 7,160 feet of film. The average time per reel is between 10 and 15 minutes. As a result, they estimated the total time for this movie to be between 70 minutes and 1 3/4 hours.

==== Studios ====
In 1922, Robertson-Cole Distributing Corporation restructured and changed its name FBO. The new company bought land in Los Angeles on the corner of Melrose Avenue and Gower Street. FBO then erected studios and administration offices on the new parcel of land. These new individual film stages would provide resources for filming a motion picture's interior scenes.

FBO company bought 460 acres for outdoor filming in Santa Monica. The area was soon dubbed the "R-C Ranch." The ranch could provide the backdrop needed for most exterior photography.

== Release and reception ==
Loyal Lives (the other Mailman movie) debuted in Marion, Ohio, on July 15, 1923. The film premiered in New York City in August and appeared in Los Angeles the following month. FBO would premiere its product four months later. As opposed to other companies' practice of debuting a film in New York or Los Angeles, FBO staged a premiere double-header. FBO designated Washington and Philadelphia for their exclusive previews, with Washington being a clear choice because of the location of the offices of the Post Master General. Shortly after that, FBO scheduled the film for its coast-to-coast appearances. A world premiere took place in Los Angeles, and then the movie began an indefinite run in New York City a week later.

=== Premieres ===
==== Washington ====
Thursday morning, November 1, 1923
The newly rebuilt Ambassador Theatre accommodated the Washington Preview. The theater provided a full orchestra, house staff, uniformed ushers, and a doorman. An article in the Exhibitors Trade Review dated November 17, 1923, reported a pre-showing of The Mailman, in "an auditorium crowded with foreign diplomats, American society leaders, political highlights, and over seventy-five prominent exhibitors in the southeastern portion of the United States." FBO also arranged an additional private showing for the new Postmaster General Harry New and his staff of assistant postmasters at his downtown office headquarters.

==== Philadelphia ====
Thursday morning, November 1, 1923
What is the significance of Philadelphia? In 1775, the Second Continental Congress convened in Philadelphia. Items on their agenda included designating Benjamin Franklin as the first postmaster general.

In a unique selection for a private showing, the "trade premiere" of "The Mailman" was hosted at "Ed Fay's Knickerbocker." Marcus Loew opened The Knickerbocker Theatre in 1914. In 1919, Loew sold the theatre to Edward Fay. Fay renamed the Knickerbocker to "Fay's Theatre." An Exhibitors Herald piece claimed the showing "was attended by 2,900 people." An article in the Motion Picture News further clarified - "attended by twenty-nine hundred people with eight hundred of them standing through the performance". The "trade premiere" used a "Navy Day" tie-up with the film. Marine and Navy honor guards were present, and the Navy sent a reel of Navy pictures.

An additional point, Edward Fay, the theater's proprietor, was based in Providence, Rhode Island. Providence hosted the 1923 National Association of Letter Carriers convention in September. Ralph Lewis attended the NALC convention in Providence because of his involvement in this movie He had also been present at Police and Fire Chiefs' conventions because of his leading roles in In the Name of the Law and The Third Alarm.

==== Los Angeles ====
Saturday, November 17, 1923

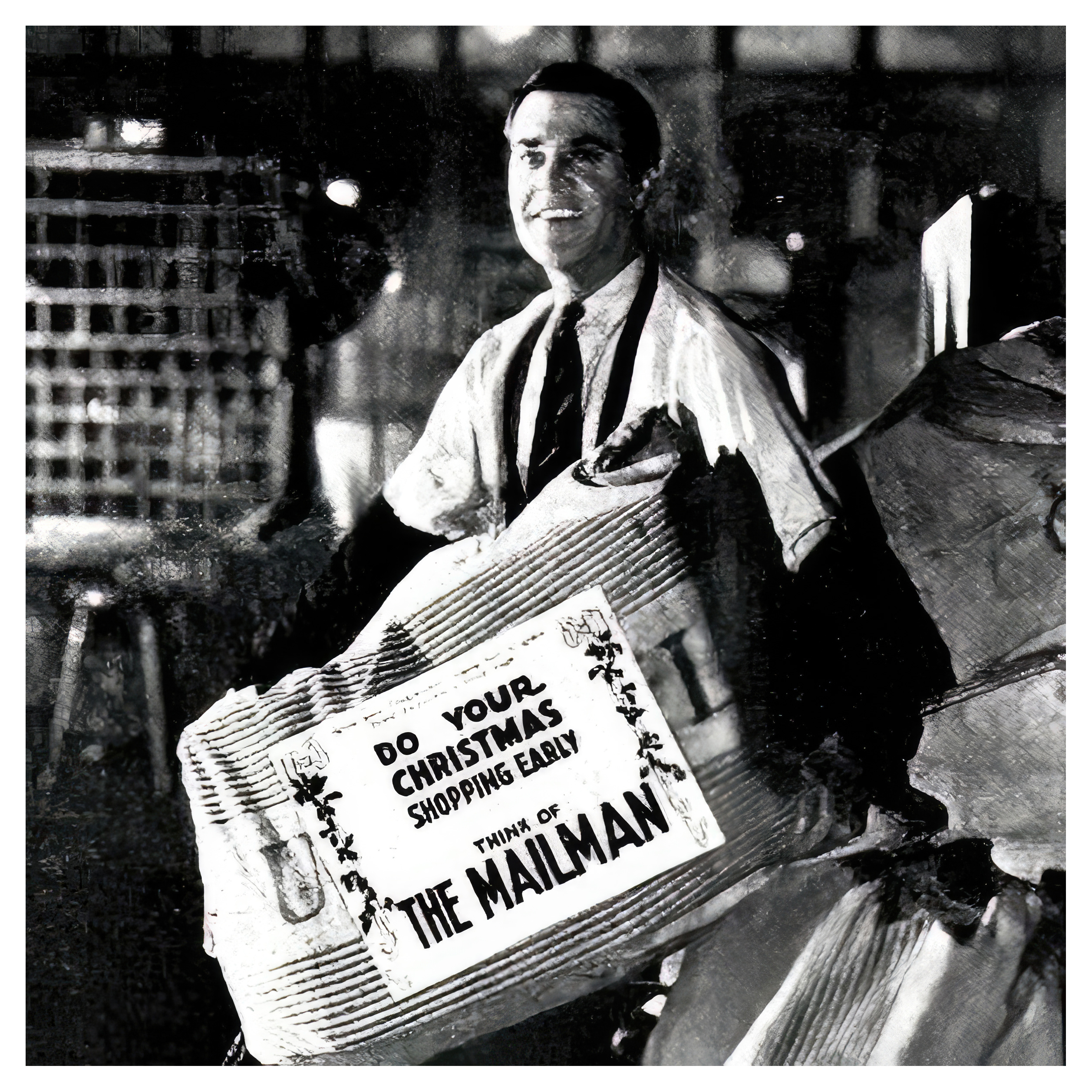

The Exhibitors Trade Review claimed The Mailman had its world's premiere on Saturday, November 17, at Loew's State Theatre in the Broadway Theatre District of Downtown Los Angeles. At the conclusion of the showing, the movie received a standing ovation. The gala surrounding the movie included the mail workers' band of sixty pieces serenading the Postmaster of the city and "monster radio jollification" broadcast to two million listeners featuring speeches, songs, and brief talks by Ralph Lewis, Johnnie Walker, Dave Kirby and others of the "Mailman" cast. There were also banners announcing the showing of "The Mailman" and tying up with the "Do your Xmas shopping early" movement were hung on all mail delivery and collection wagons.

=== New York cameo ===
Sunday, November 25, 1923

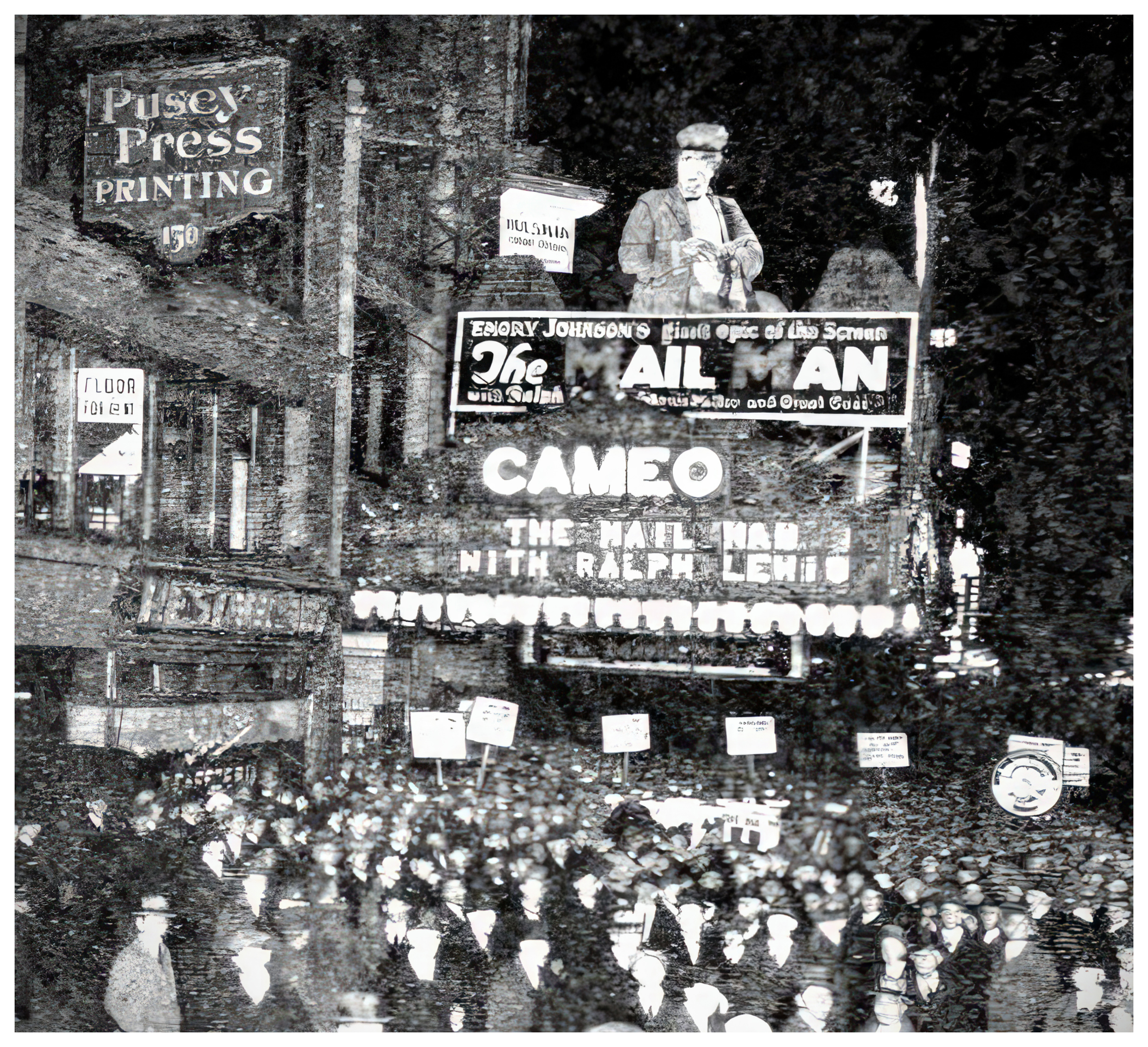
Cameo Opening

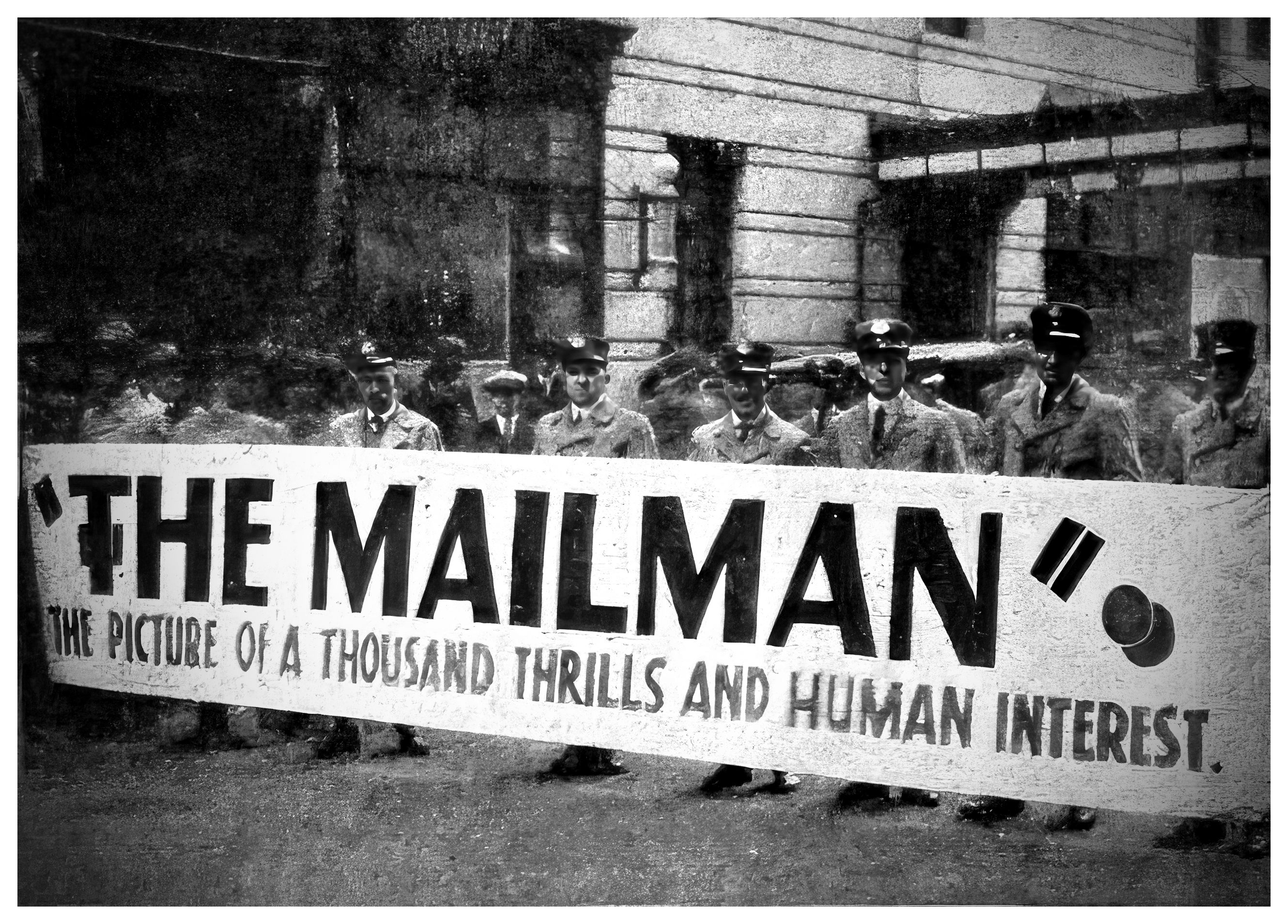
Marching in New York

New York City had a tradition of premiering Emory Johnson's films. In July 1922, Johnson premiered his first motion picture, In The Name of the Law at the George M. Cohan Theater. FBO premiered Johnson's second production, "The Third Alarm," in January 1923 at the prestigious Astor Theatre. In April 1923, FBO premiered John's third film, The West~Bound Limited. by booking a ballroom at the Astor Hotel. FBO had already taken a different approach to introduce this film. The movie had already had exclusive previews in Washington, Philadelphia, and Los Angeles. Yet, no other event could bring as much publicity as packing in the sophisticated New York audience on Broadway.

Emory and Ella Johnson made an early trip to New York to promote the film. "100 letter carriers and their band of 40 pieces," greeted the couple when they arrived. Then a parade down Broadway attracted crowds along New York's Great White Way." Film producers staged a "Movie Day" parade on Saturday, November 17. Although the parade's purpose was to honor the movie-making companies, FBO dominated the procession with "over 200 uniform carriers, carrying 10-foot banners and led by the postal clerk's band, swung down Broadway, advertising to the people lining the curve that the picture was coming to the cameo theater."

Finally, The Mailman opened at the Cameo Theatre on November 25, 1923, for an indefinite run with "an exploitation campaign, rivaling anything ever attempted by the film booking offices".

On November 26, there was another parade. This time, the New York Letter Carriers band marched from City Hall along Broadway to the theatre to receive a cash award for the best postal band in the country.

=== Official release ===
On November 3, 1923, The Mailman was copyrighted to R-C (Robertson-Cole) Pictures Corp with a registration number of LP19561. The copyrights for FBO Films were registered with their original British owners. FBO was the official name of the film-distributing operation for Robertson-Cole Pictures Corp. Joseph P. Kennedy Sr. would rectify this confusion at a later date.

According to the American Film Institute, this film was officially released for bookings on Sunday, December 9, 1923, by Film Booking Offices of America.

=== Advertising ===
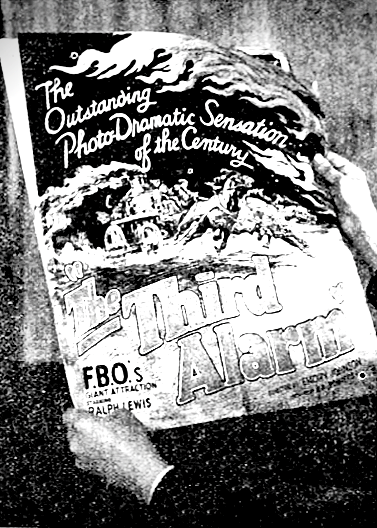
Campaign book for The Third Alarm 1922

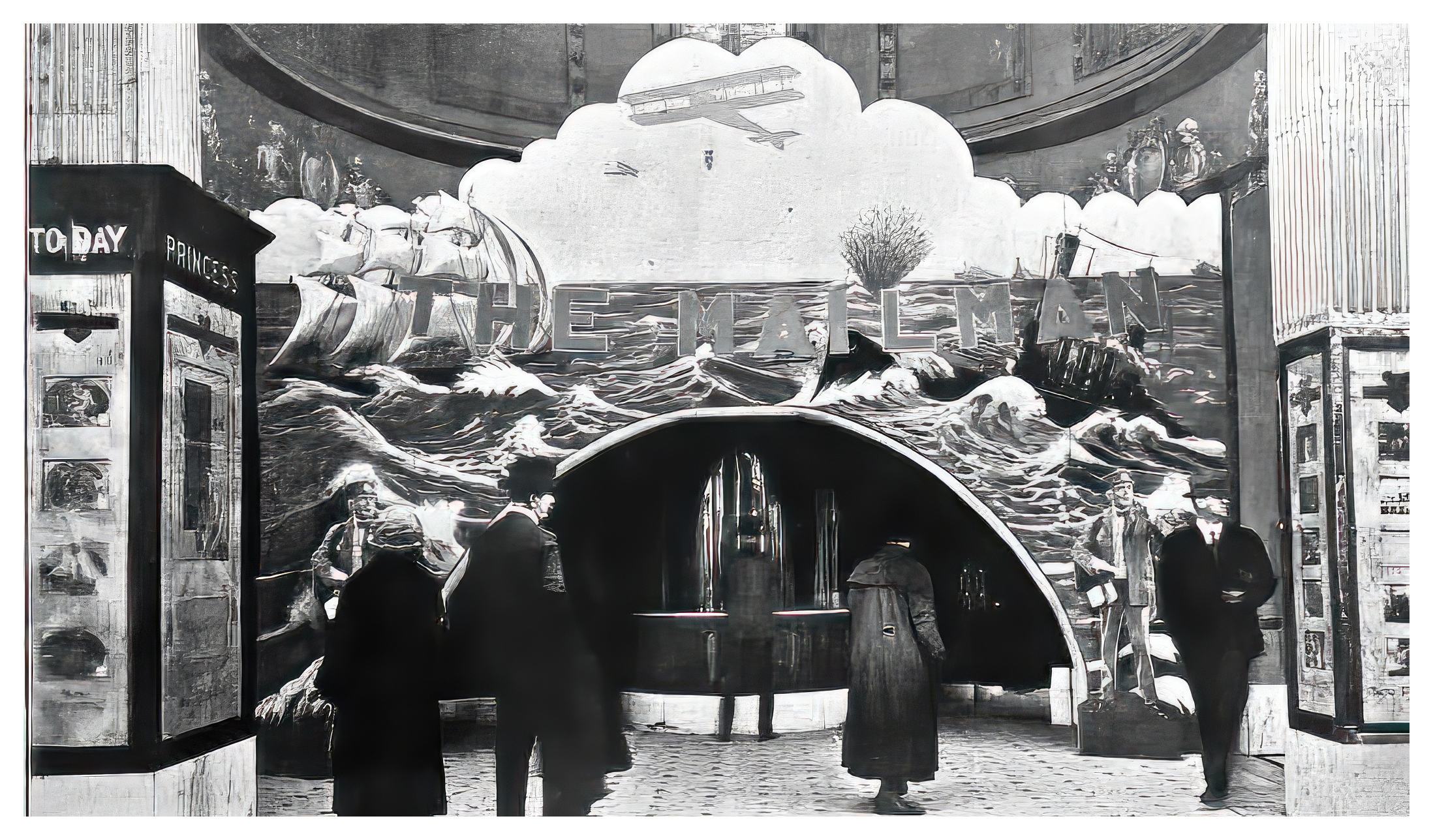
Theatre advertising The Mailman 1924

As mentioned earlier, in 1922, the United States Post Office had 339,000 personnel and 52,000 postmasters in America. Those numbers could generate a great deal of free advertising. When The Mailman opened at the Cameo Theatre, FBO planned "an exploitation campaign, rivaling anything ever attempted by the film booking offices".

Thus, F.B.O. adopted the same advertising strategy they deployed in promoting Johnson's prior three films. They would create a local tie-ins with the public servants portrayed in the film, i.e., reach out to the local postmasters before the film arrived in the city. Many local post office departments provided the movie with free advertising by organizing parades featuring the local postal employee bands. These parades would end at the local theater showing the film. Post offices also benefited from the film by publicizing their "Do Your Christmas Shopping Early" campaign. They further used the film as a vehicle to request higher pay.

FBO gave 4,000 discounted tickets to letter carriers and postal employees in New York to watch the film. They also sponsored a national contest for the best Postal band, awarding a $300 prize for finishing in first-place.

FBO would provide a newspaper-size campaign book if the theater owners had questions about employing revue-producing strategies for this film. This film had a well-organized and straightforward time-tested process for exploitation.

=== Reviews ===
Movie reviews were essential perspectives for theater owners and fans. Reviews of movies printed in various trade magazines were indispensable in deciding whether to book or watch the film. When critics had contrasting reviews, choosing whether to see or book the movie can be challenging, especially since discordant reviews do not mean it is necessarily a bad movie. Ultimately, it boiled down to personal choices and how much value you place on the movie review and the reviewer.

Melodrama films captivate the audience by weaving narratives that evoke intense emotions. These films primarily focus on family dynamics, centering around characters who face adversity and exploring themes of duty and love. The melodramatic format portrays characters navigating their challenges with unwavering determination, selfless acts, and bravery.

Movie critics and theater owners often use the following expressions to describe the movies they are reviewing or showing.
Terms used in reviewing silent movie melodrama

The film premiered at the Cameo Theatre in New York City on November 25, 1923. The November 30, 1923, issue of The Film Daily included newspaper reviews by critics underwhelmed by the epic. We see phrases like, "The film is a quiet affair," "the entire cast means well", and "commercial heroes that drag in every conceivable kind of melodramatic thrill" mixed with "Young producer's biggest production effort."

The newspaper movie reviews published in the December 15, 1923, issue of Motion Picture News are more optimistic, considering they were published three weeks after the film premiered.

==== Critical response ====
- In the December 8, 1923, issue of the Exhibitors Trade Review, Eddy Eckels states:
  "Quite a lot of possibilities on this one for the average house. It is brimful of human interest and home ties to say nothing of sensational thrills. Like all of Johnson's efforts, "The Mail Man" deals with the steadfastness and heroism of a public servitor. He is shown in all the happenings of his daily routine and Emory has taught us all that routine can be made interesting."
- In the December 8, 1923, issue of the Moving Picture World, Mary Kelly writes:
  "Generous in heart interest and thrills, Emory Johnson's latest production for F. B. 0. will bring entertainment to the many who enjoyed "The Third Alarm" and "West-Bound Limited." It is dedicated to the United States mail service in much the same spirit as the others were, to fire departments and railroad employees. It has the same sincerity and simplicity of theme with an undercurrent of drama, terminating in an exciting climax.
  Like its predecessors, The Mailman makes its great appeal to the masses. It tells a rather plain story with homelike details and without many of the subtleties that an intellectual audience demands. Probably the only exceptional scenes are those showing the capture of the yacht, by the Government fleet. But these combined with a sympathetic story sincerely set forth make an excellent box-office attraction for the average theatre."
- In the December 8, 1923, issue of The Billboard, Shumlin observes:
  "Emory Johnson's picture, should be a box-office winner, it is an exceedingly entertaining melodrama, with a simple, direct story that will undoubtedly appeal to the moviegoers. It is much better than the average cheap melodrama, in that, altho a good deal of old-fashioned hokum is used, it has been directed with great skill. There is a large demand for the old-fashioned, tear-jerking, and sympathy-compelling mellers, but most producers slap together a picture of this sort with so little care that they are frightfully crude and amateurish. Emory Johnson proves that it is possible to make a picture for the masses without offending intelligence.
  The Mailman should make a lot of money. It is the kind of picture past performances have proved the public wants. And what the public wants it should get. Just because what the public wants are not plays that would appeal to people who enjoy Shaw or Ibsen is no reason why intelligent directors should not make them. An intelligent director has made The Mailman

==== Audience response ====
FBO focused on producing and distributing films for small-town venues. They served this market melodramas, non-Western action pictures, and comedic shorts. Unlike major Hollywood studios, FBO owned no movie theaters and depended on movie house proprietors renting their films. Like most independents, FBO depended on the movie house owners to renting their films to show a profit.

Before leasing a film, picture house owners were concerned that the film is a potential moneymaker in their locale. Proprietors would subscribe to trade journals to assist them in making these financial judgments. Movie magazines would show the film's branding, critical reviews and publish other managers' viewpoints, including attendance numbers and revenue.

The audience's response to this film was positive. Most small towns liked the film (FBO's base) and the larger venues were not as optimistic yet not displeased with the attendance. These are brief published observations from movie house owners.

- H. Woody, Princess theatre, Lincoln, Kansas, population 1, 613
  " The Mail Man, with Ralph Lewis. — This is just about one of the best and biggest pictures that I have run. No love plot, other than the father and son theme, but it sure holds interest from first to last. The bombardment by the Pacific fleet is worth admission, which can easily be raised and picture will back it up. Had a good crowd and swell print, which is very unusual for me. Not a stop in the whole picture.
- C. A. Anglemire, "Y" Theatre (403 seats), Nazareth, Pennsylvania population 4,500
  "MAILMAN Ralph Lewis. This made a good show for Decoration Day. It pleased most all of them, even though it is filled with plenty of the old stuff. Print O. K. Tone O. K. Good attendance, better class in town of 4,500. Admission ten cents.
- Edward Laczynski, Park theatre, Buffalo, New York, population 506,775

"The Mailman, with Ralph Lewis. — This picture sure has all the hokum in it. However, it went over fine. The kids simply raved over it.

== Preservation status ==
Many silent-era films did not survive for reasons as explained on this Wikipedia page. (Note: Film is history. With every foot of film lost, we lose a link to our culture, the world around us, each other, and ourselves. – Martin Scorsese, filmmaker, director NFPF Board A report by Library of Congress film historian and archivist David Pierce estimates that: around 75% of original silent-era films have perished; 14% of the 10,919 silent films released by major studios exist in their original 35 mm or other formats; 11% survive only in full-length foreign versions or film formats of lesser image quality.) According to the Library of Congress American Silent Feature Film Survival Database, two reels of this film survive. (Note: The posting on the Library of Congress Silent Feature Database, reads as follows: Archive: Gosfilmofond of Russia (Moscow) [Rur] Holdings: Foreign Archive Studio: R-C/FBO Note: 2 reels)

== The other Mailman movie ==
An article published on December 15, 1923, the interview had a section titled, "Keep Plans Secret."
"I have decided on the next calling I shall use, but I cannot say what it will be. We happen to announce the subject of "The Mail Man" and another company rushed a picture through, using the same theme. So, I have learned to keep my consul."

— Emory Johnson talking to newspaper reporter George C. Warren,

Loyal Lives is a 1923 silent melodrama directed by Charles Giblyn and distributed by Vitagraph Studios. Postman Pictures released the film in July 1923. The film featured Brandon Tynan in the role of Dan O'Brien and Mary Carr playing the mother figure of Mary O'Brien. William Collier Jr. played Dan's son Terrence and Faire Binney played his younger sister Peggy. The cast also included actors portraying the O'Hara family. Mickey Bennett plays Terrence as a child. The movie was six reels or 5,950 feet. The film premiered in Marion, Ohio, on July 15, 1923. It opened in New York City on August 5, 1923, and in Los Angeles on September 2, 1923.

A synopsis of the plot - Dan O'Brien is a postal employee struggling to support his family on his meager salary. While the family is cash-strapped, Dan has saved money for his son's (Terrence) education and the adoption of a little girl left on their doorstep. Seventeen years later, Terrence becomes a postal employee like his father. There is a great robbery of a fully equipped mail train. Terrance saves the mailbag, and Dan stops the crooks from robbing the safe.

The film contains In the Name of the Law elements and plot points from The Third Alarm. Using an advertising ploy borrowed from the FBO campaign books, Vitagraph made the Whitman Bennett production with the full cooperation and assistance of the United States Postal Service. The following news item appeared in the June 1923 issue of the Exhibitors Herald:

NEW YORK, May 22. — Whitman Bennett has got the cooperation of the post office department in Washington in filming his production for Vitagraph "Loyal Lives," a romance of the mail carrier and his life. Under orders from Postmaster General Harry New, the assistant postmaster general, Paul Henderson, accompanied by a staff of postal officials, made a special trip from Washington to New York to personally arrange the technical details and supervise the staging of a spectacular mail train hold-up scene that will be one of the outstanding features in the production.

Emory Johnson and FBO were likely shocked at this attempt to capitalize on their series of working-man films. Working-class heroes featured In the Name of the Law, The Third Alarm, and The West~Bound Limited had all proved to be profitable projects. Bennett not only copied the concept of glorifying everyday working men but brazenly released his film while Johnson was still working on his. Where did Bennett receive his inspiration?

In early 1923, an announcement was made concerning the next working-class hero Johnson intended to honor. It is unclear who leaked the postal worker storyline first, but one of the earliest examples is listed here. A Film Daily news item dated January 12, 1923, read:

Powers Back from Coast
P. A. Powers of the F. B. O. returned yesterday from the Coast. He is enthusiastic regarding the production schedule . . . In addition, Emory Johnson, whose "Third Alarm" has just been released, is "working on a letter carrier story".

Postman Pictures saw an opportunity and jumped on this working-class cash cow. They quickly produced a less-than-epic low-cost film about postal workers. The company recruited a well-known director, used identical Irish character names, then employed the same exploitation techniques in advertising pioneered by FBO.

The opinion of one theater owner is presented below;

H. S. Stansel, Rulevllle Theatre (250 seats), Ruleville, Mississippi population 1,021

"LOYAL LIVES Star cast. We call this real downright sorry. We saw the "Mailman'" from another company and thought we bought it when we signed for this. When we saw the picture, we were disgusted, and this was advertised by us and to us as a special. Vitagraph seems headed for oblivion in our town. Had poor attendance. Draw farming class Admission 10-30.

== Gallery ==
Principal Players and Director
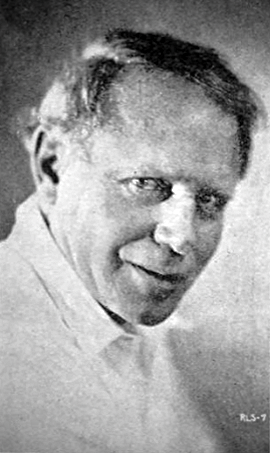
Ralph Lewis
Bob Morley

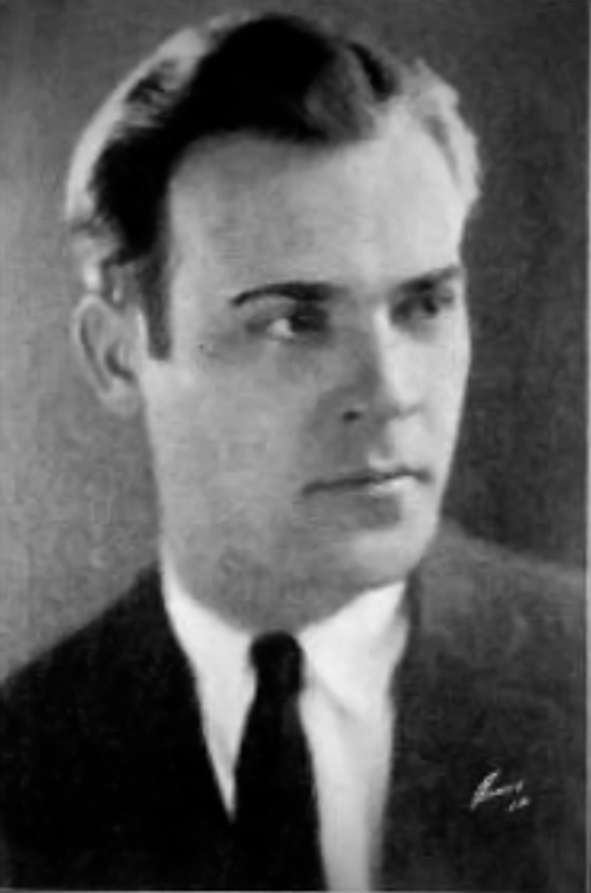
Johnnie Walker
Johnnie Morley

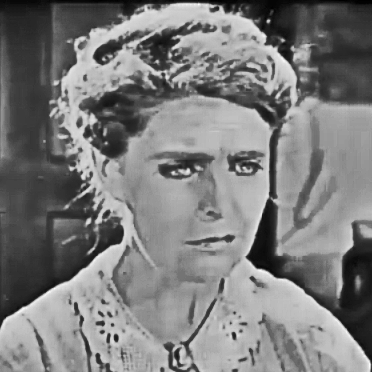
Virginia True Boardman
Mrs. Morley

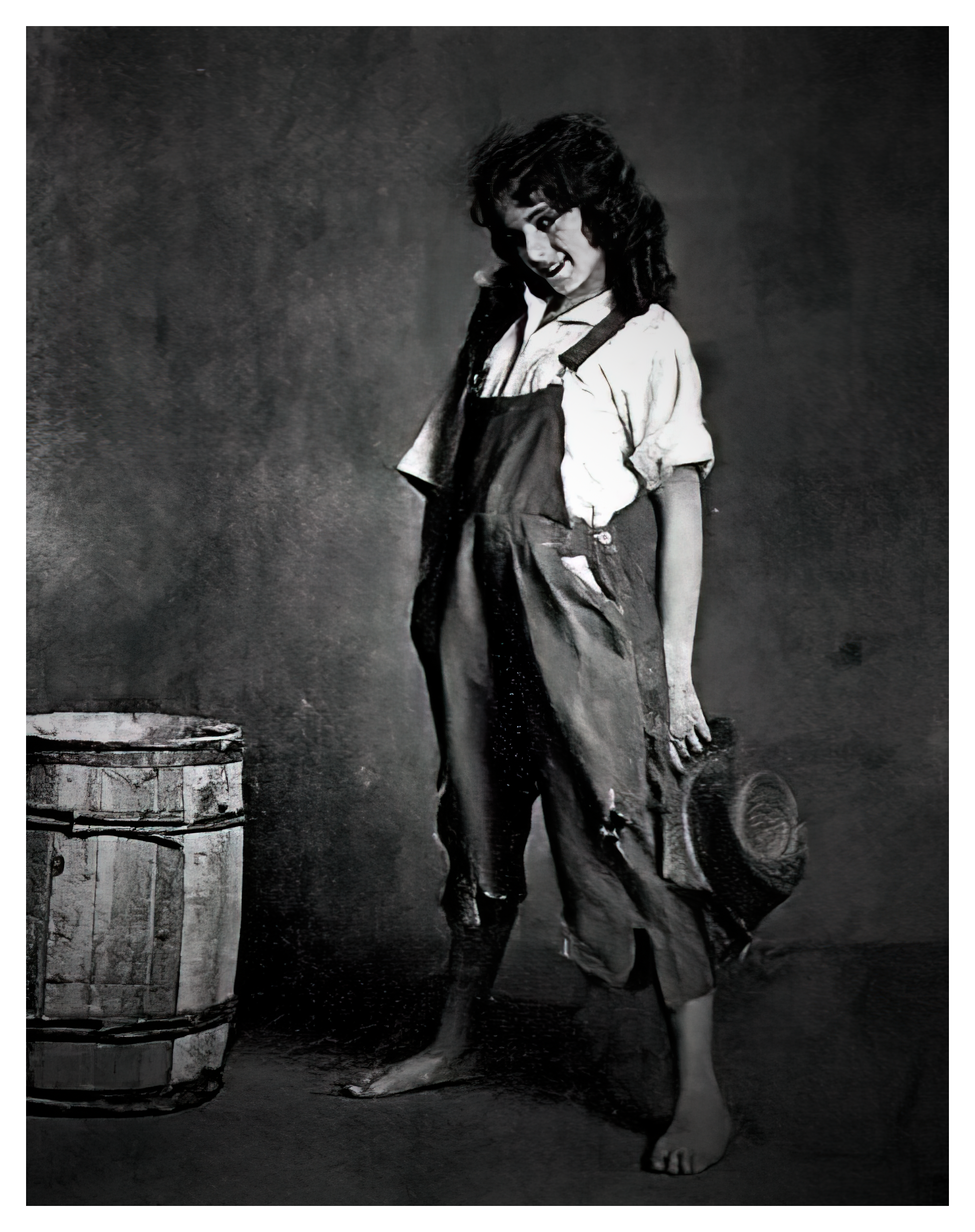
Martha Sleeper
Betty Morley

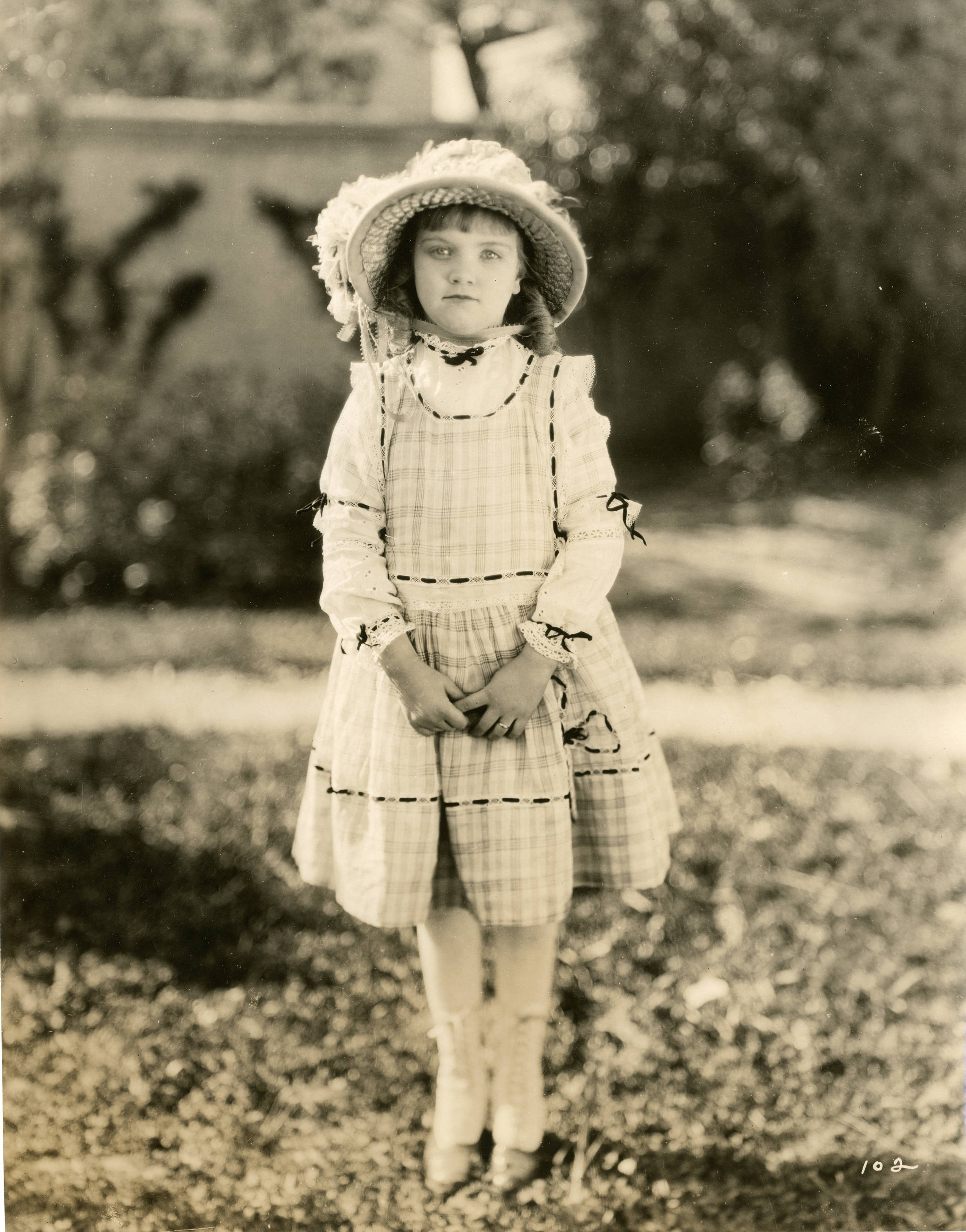
Josephine Adair
Virginia Morgan

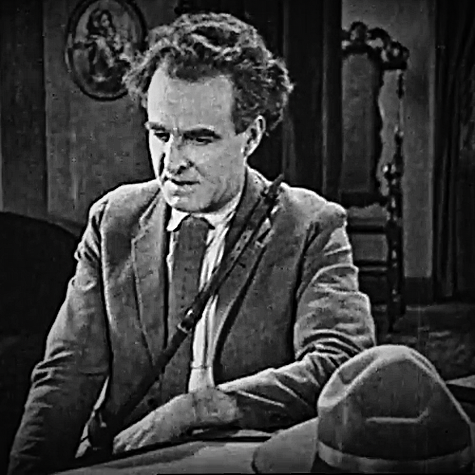
David Kirby
Red Morgan

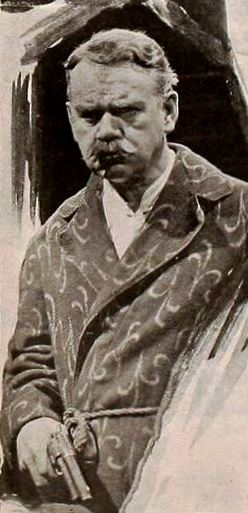
Hardee Kirkland
Captain Franz

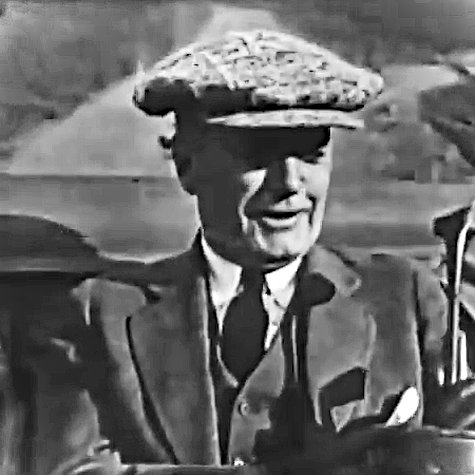
Richard Morris
Admiral Fleming

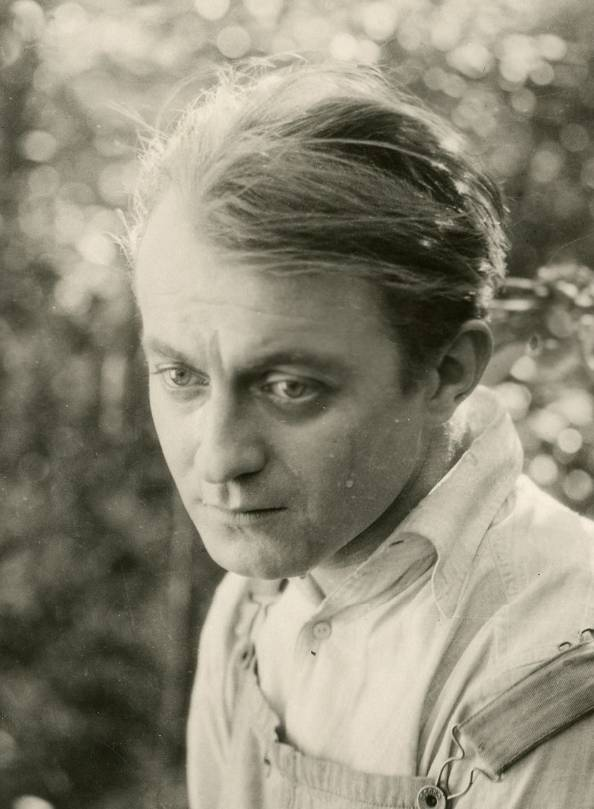
Taylor Graves
Harry Morgan

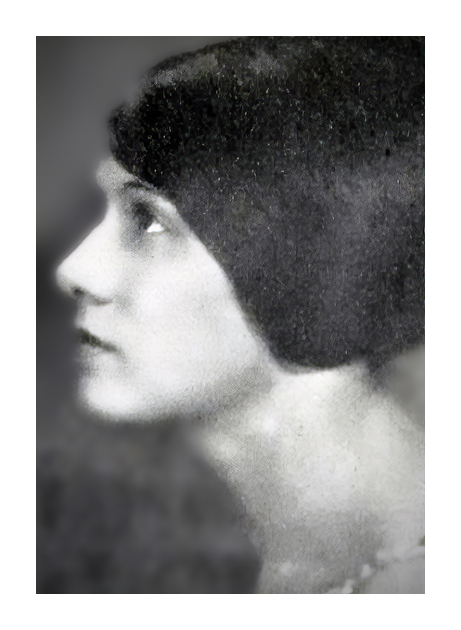
Rosemary Cooper
Mrs. Thompson

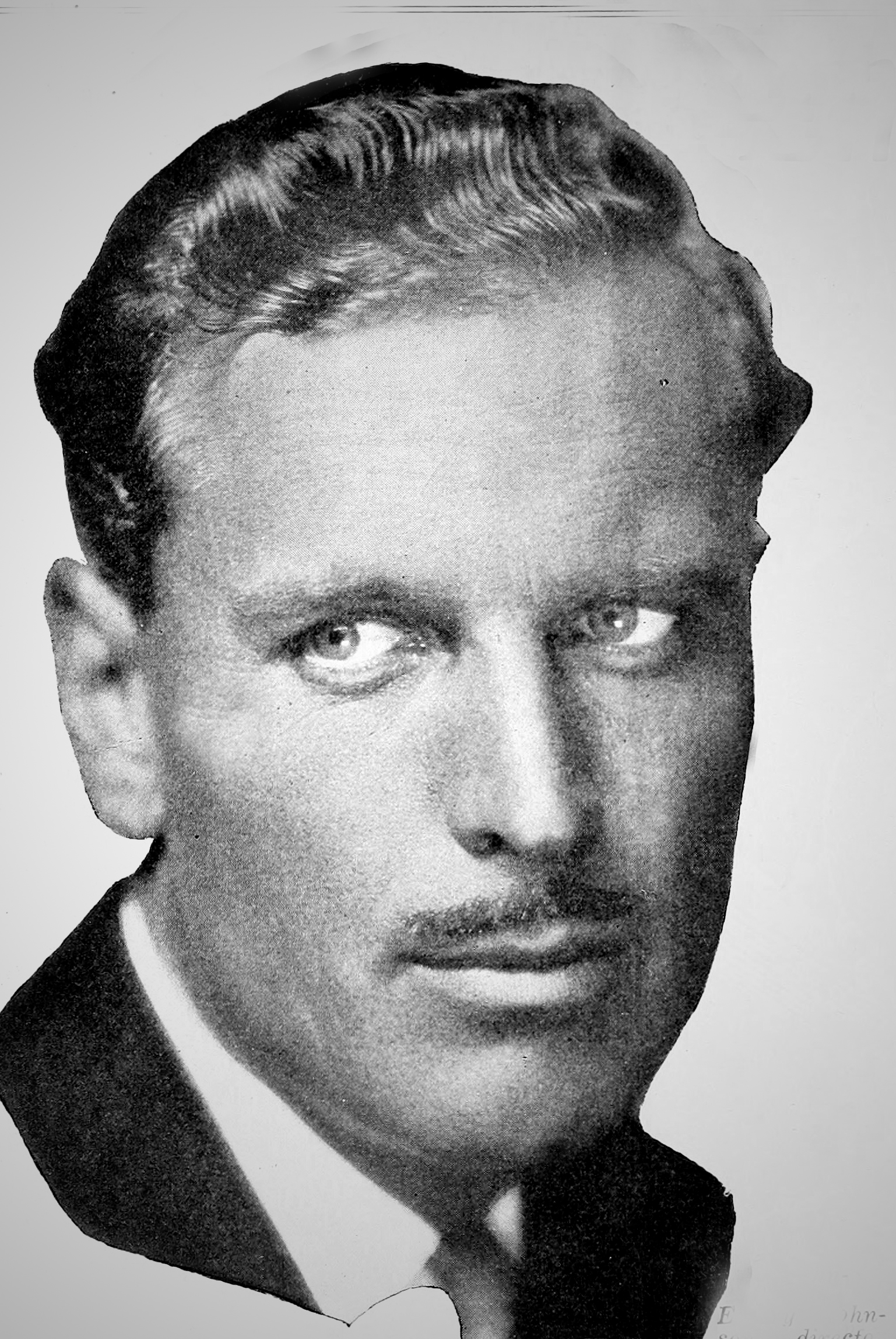
Emory Johnson
Director

== Bibliography ==
- Goodwin, Doris Kearns (1991). The Fitzgeralds and the Kennedys: An American Saga. Manhattan, New York City: St. Martin's Press. p. 932. ISBN 978-0-312-06354-2. "Book Two: The Kennedys (1915-1940) - Chapter 20 This is a gold mine"
- Jewell, R.B.; Harbin, V. (1982). The RKO Story. Arlington House. ISBN 978-0-517-54656-7.
- Lasky, B. (1989). RKO: The Biggest Little Major of Them All. Roundtable Pub. ISBN 978-0-915677-41-2.
- Kawin, Bruce F. (1987). How Movies Work. University of California Press. p. 46. ISBN 9780520076969.
- Kitchmer, George A. (2002). A Biographical Dictionary of Silent Film Western Actors and Actresses. Jefferson, North Carolina: McFarland & Company, Inc. ISBN 978-0-7864-4693-3.
- Sherwood, Robert (1974). The best moving pictures of 1922-23, also Who's who in the movies and the Yearbook of the American screen. Revisionist Press. ISBN 978-0877001362.
- Slide, Anthony (2000). Nitrate Won't Wait: History of Film Preservation in the United States. McFarland. p. 5. ISBN 978-0786408368. "It is often claimed that 75 percent of all American silent films are gone and 50 percent of all films made prior to 1950 are lost, but such figures, as archivists admit in private, were thought up on the spur of the moment, without statistical information to back them up."
