= The West~Bound Limited =

1923 American silent melodrama film

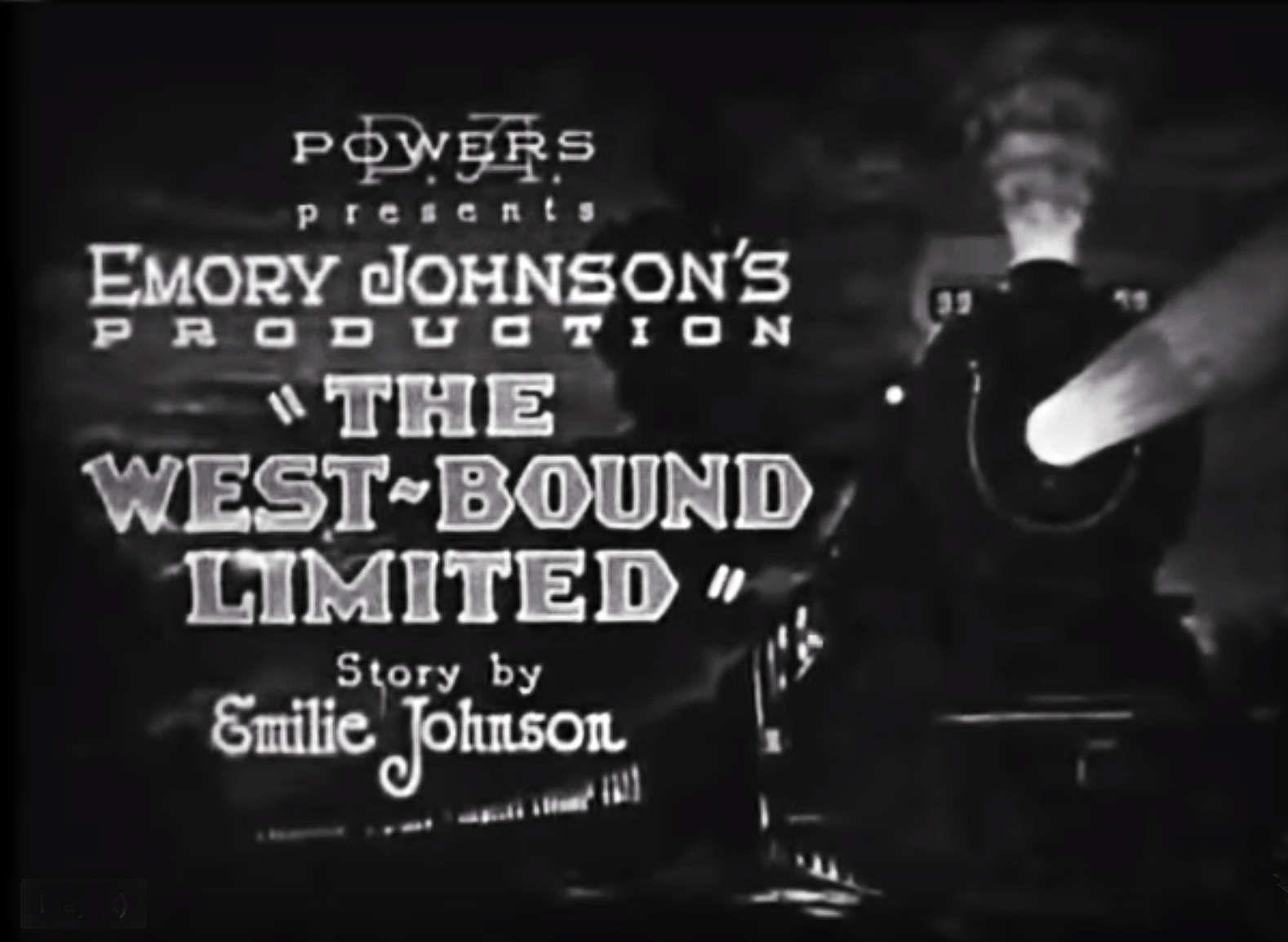
- Film's opening title
- Directed by: Emory Johnson; Charles M. Watt Asst dir
- Written by: Emilie Johnson; Story and Screenplay
- Produced by: Pat Powers; Emory Johnson
- Starring: Ralph Lewis
- Cinematography: Ross Fisher
- Distributed by: Film Booking Offices of America
- Release date: April 15, 1923
- Running time: 62–72 minutes
- Country: United States
- Language: Silent (English intertitles)
- Budget: $50,000 (equivalent to $809,443 in 2021).
- Box office: $226,000 (equivalent to $3,653,779 in 2021).

The West~Bound Limited is a 1923 American silent melodrama film directed by Emory Johnson. FBO released the film in April 1923. The film's "All-Star" cast included Ralph Lewis, Claire McDowell, Johnny Harron, and Ella Hall. Emilie Johnson, Johnson's mother, wrote both the story and screenplay. The West~Bound Limited was the third film in Johnson's eight-picture contract with FBO.

Esther Miller, the daughter of the railway President, and her mother are riding horses alongside the railroad tracks. When Esther tries to cross the tracks, her horse gets its hoof caught on the track. While attempting to help the horse, Esther also becomes entangled. Railroad engineer Bill Buckley is steaming down the mainline towards the helpless Esther and her horse. Bill Buckley's son, Johnny, rescues her at the last minute. Esther develops an instant affection for her newfound hero. A grateful Esther gives Johnny her horse, and a content father provides the Buckley family with a new home. Soon, the President's general counselor, J. Lawrence Wilton, reveals he has feelings for Esther and is plotting to win Esther's hand in marriage. Wilton arranges a chain of machinations involving Esther, Bill Buckley, Mrs. Buckley, and Johnny. Johnny thwarts Wilton's schemes and saves his father and hundreds of train passengers from disaster. Johnny rescues Esther from the villainous Wilton and falls in love. Wilton's intrigues finally reap their just rewards, and everybody lives happily ever after.

The film was released on April 15, 1923.

== Plot ==
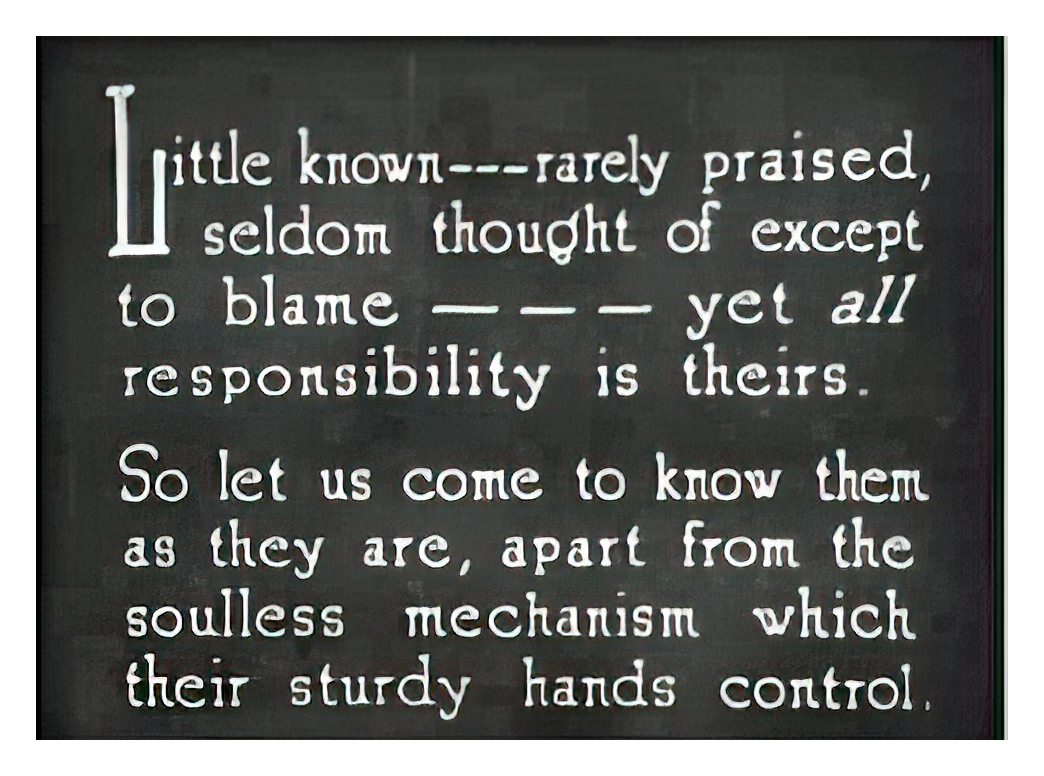
Opening Frame to Movie

Bernard Miller is the President of a railroad, and Lawrence Wilton is his general counselor. Both are traveling in an open car, paralleling the tracks when they see Bill Buckley's engine steaming down the rails. Miller's only daughter, Esther, and her mother ride horses in the same area. When Esther attempts to go over a level crossing, her horse gets caught in the tracks and falls. The fallen horse traps Esther. Bill Buckley's son, Johnny, sees Esther's plight from his telegraph hut. With Bill Buckley's engine bearing down, Johnny rushes to save Esther and frees her at the last second. A grateful Esther gives Johnny her horse, and their close encounter has prompted romantic feelings in Esther. After watching the rescue, Miller tells Wilton he plans to reward the Buckley family with a house.

The following morning, Wilton drives the Millers to the passenger depot for an arranged trip to San Francisco. As Wilton is leaving, a man approaches him and demands money. He threatens Wilton by claiming he will "spill the beans about you and your kid." Wilton gives him cash and rides off. Wilton visits Buckley's home and shows Mrs. Buckley the deed to their new home. Mrs. Buckley tells Wilton to keep the gift a secret because she wants to surprise her husband.

When Bill Buckley comes to work, he learns he has a new crew member – Collins. The crewman is the same man who extorted Wilton for cash. Buckley mounts his engine along with Collins and starts his daily run. Buckley notices Collins take a quick drink from a bottle he had concealed. Collins offers Buckley a drink, which he refuses, and a struggle ensues with Buckley finally tossing the bottle out of the cab. Buckley's Westbound 99 arrives two hours early, and Collins is drunk. A supervisor sees a drunken Collins and fires him. Collins blames Buckley and swears revenge.

Johnny's dog appears at the Miller home. Esther sees the dog and comes up with a plan to see Johnny. She attaches a note to the dog's collar, telling Johnny to look for smoke from the chimney. It will be a signal that Wilton has left the house. The dog returns to Johnny's shack. Johnny reads the request and smiles.

At the Miller home, Wilton tells the housemaid to "Have Sylvester bring the roadster around for me — then he can take you marketing in the other car." Esther hears Wilton's request and starts stacking wood in the fireplace. Wilton has second thoughts, realizing that he will be alone with Esther if he remains. He returns to the house as Esther lights a fire in the fireplace. Wilton asks her if she would like to drive to town, but she declines. He shuts the door, walks over to Esther, and tries to kiss her. Esther resists Wilton's advances. Wilton grabs her and throws her on the couch. She screams and continues struggling while smoking logs burn in the fireplace. Johnny sees the smoke and starts galloping toward the house. Johnny arrives at the Miller house and senses Esther's in trouble.

He goes inside Miller's home and rushes toward the source of the screams. He breaks down the door, finds Wilton trying to assault Esther, and the two men struggle. Wilton draws a pistol, and a shot rings out. Bill Buckley is walking up to the front porch of the Miller house. Buckley wants to inquire about his old home when he hears a gunshot. Buckley runs inside and discovers his son and Wilton grappling with a gun. He takes the pistol out of Wilton's hands and threatens him. Johnny calms his dad, then leaves with Esther. Bill Buckley and Esther drive off in the roadster, trailing Johnny mounted on his horse. Johnny leads his dad to their new home. Johnny tells his dad that Esther's father gave them the house, but Mrs. Buckley wants to surprise him. Mother Buckley and their adopted son, Henry, rush out to greet them.

The Millers are relaxing in a San Francisco hotel. Mr. Miller receives a letter from Esther. She begs the couple to return home. The following morning, Wilton discovers the Millers are returning home on a special train. Collins shows up at the house. He confronts Wilton, saying he needs more cash because Buckley fired him. Wilton hatches a nefarious plan.

Bill Buckley's Westbound 99 will steam down the mainline in one direction. In contrast, Miller's special train 66 will travel down the same track from the opposite direction. Since Miller's special will have priority, Johnny Buckley will have to signal his father to stop and move his train to a siding. The two trains will collide if Johnny fails, killing Bill Buckley and the Millers. They will blame Johnny for the crash. Wilton will assume the presidency of the railroad and become Esther's guardian.

Johnny receives instructions from the dispatcher to flag down "99" and park his train. Johnny promptly raises the red light. However, Collins climbs the signal pole and covers the red light with a green filter. As Bill Buckley steams down the track, he sees the green light and blows past the stop signal. Johnny telegraphs the dispatcher, "99" missed the stop signal, and he will take a shortcut to flag down the trains. Johnny mounts his horse and gallops into the darkness. Soon he reaches the edge of a steep embankment. He must reach the bottom of the hill to flag the trains. The horse stumbles as they descend, and both somersault down the hill. When Johnny hits the bottom, he has a broken leg. Since the injury prevents him from signaling the trains, he lights a fire. He hopes both engineers will view the brush fire and halt their engines.

The Miller special is barreling down the track when the engineer notices the brushfire. He stops his train to investigate. Bill Buckley, coming from the opposite direction, sees the same fire stop his train. They avert the head-on collision. Johnny lights a railroad flare, and Bill Buckley sees the torch and rushes towards the bright light. Buckley sees his son lying helpless at the edge of the brushfire, rescues him, and carries him to safety.

Wilton shows up at the Buckley home to fetch Esther. Mother Buckley says Esther is not there, but Wilton finds her hiding in a closet. A struggle ensues, but Esther escapes. Mother Buckley grapples with Wilton, but he throws her to the floor. A gun appears, and someone fires a shot, wounding Wilton. Buckley's adopted son, Henry, is gripping the pistol. Wilton looks at Henry and says – "by my flesh and blood." Buckley's orphan lad turns out to be Wilton's mysterious son.

In the last scene, Johnny and Esther are on the back of a train departing on their honeymoon.

== Cast ==
Actor	Role
Ralph Lewis	Bill Buckley
Claire McDowell	Mrs. Bill Buckley
John Harron	Johnny Buckley
Taylor Graves	Henry
Richard Morris	Bernard Miller
Jennie (Jane) Morgan	Mrs. Bernard Miller
Ella Hall	Esther Miller
Wedgewood Nowell	J. Lawrence Wilton
David Kirby	Collins

== Production ==
=== Pre production ===
==== Development ====
Melodrama is our meat – but it's high-class melodrama. It allowed the public to weep and sympathize with the handsome hero and the beautiful heroine. We don't want to label our pictures, we must make pictures that appeal to all.

— Joe Kennedy
Member FBO board of directors,
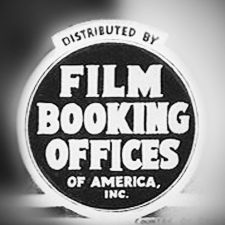
FBO distribution logo from 1926

Film Booking Offices of America (FBO) was an energetic, independent American silent era film studio. The company released around 110 features and shorts a year. The company focused on producing low-budget films emphasizing first-class westerns, action films, romantic melodramas, and comedy shorts. The company mainly distributed its pictures to small-town venues and independent theater chains, which changed their pictures three times a week. FBO would make their pictures appeal to every member of the American family.

The average cost per FBO production was $50,000 to $75,000 equivalent to $961,730 to $1,442,594 in 2021 compared to the Major film studios which could spend five times as much to produce a movie.

FBO also produced and distributed a limited number of big-budget features labeled "Gold Bond" or "Special" productions. Emory Johnson's eight films for FBO were all specials. This film would be classified as a Super-Special.

In 1923, Emilie and Emory Johnson signed a contract extension with FBO. The contract was for 2 1/2 years. The agreement stipulated Emory was to make eight attractions for FBO. The agreement specified that his previous four films would count toward the total. FBO also agreed to invest two and a half million dollars (In today's money – equivalent to $40,472,167 in 2021) on the remaining four films. Another part of the new contract stipulated – "The contract also provides that Emory Johnson's mother, Mrs. Emilie Johnson, shall prepare all of the stories and write all the scripts for the Johnson attractions in addition to assisting her son in filming the productions."

==== Casting ====
- Ralph Lewis (1872–1931) was born on October 8, 1872, in Englewood, Illinois. The 50 year-old actor would reprise his role as a rugged middle-aged working-class hero. In this go-around, he would assume the role of Western Division engineer Bill Buckley. He previously had starring roles in Emory Johnson's past two FBO vehicles – In the Name of the Law and The Third Alarm. Lewis would go on to star in Emory Johnson's next production – The Mailman released in December 1923. He also landed a role in Johnson's seventh film – The Last Edition, released in November 1925. The Last Edition was Lewis's fifth and final film in an Emory Johnson production. Lewis will always be remembered for his role as abolitionist U.S. Representative Austin Stoneman in D. W. Griffith's The Birth of a Nation (1915) and the governor in Intolerance (1916). "Ralph Lewis is especially good in parts built upon the strength of character."
- Claire McDowell (1877–1966) was born on November 2, 1877, in New York City. The 45 year-old actress had previously acted in In The Name of The Law. She would play Mrs. Buckley, Bill Buckley's wife, another mother figure in this photoplay. She would act in a total of four Emory Johnson productions.
- Ella Hall (1896–1981) was born on March 17, 1896, in Hoboken, New Jersey. The 27 year-old actress was selected to play the feminine lead in this film. She would portray Esther Miller, the daughter of railroad president Bernard Miller. During this filming, Hall was married to Emory Johnson. She previously had feminine leads – In the Name of the Law and The Third Alarm. Her next film would be the 1923 production of Lloyd B. Carleton's The Flying Dutchman, which became one of her best-known works. After filming the Dutchman, Ella Hall retired from silent movies to focus on her kids and her failing marriage to Emory Johnson.
- John Harron (1903–1939) was born on March 31, 1903, in New York City. The 20 year-old actor was selected to be the male lead and fill the role of Johnny Buckley, Bill Buckley's son and a "Chip of the Old Block." At the time he was best known as the younger brother of Robert Harron. Johnnie Walker was Emory Johnson's first choice for Johnny Buckley. However, Walker was having a banner year and was unavailable for the role because he was filming The Fourth Musketeer. This was Harron's only appearance in a Johnson production, while Walker would act in five Johnson vehicles.
- Richard Morris (1862–1924) was born on January 30, 1862, in Charlestown, Massachusetts. The 61 year-old actor played Bernard Miller, President of a transcontinental railroad. Morris had previously acted in In the Name of the Law and The Third Alarm. He would appear in future Johnson productions The Mailman and The Spirit of the USA before his untimely death in October 1924.
- Wedgwood Nowell (born Harry Wedgwood Nowell) (1878–1957) was an American film actor, director, producer, musician, and stage actor who was born on January 24, 1878, in Portsmouth, New Hampshire. The 45 year-old actor would portray J. Lawrence Wilton, the President's general adviser. His name credit is misspelled in the movie - Wedgewood Nowell. Many sites also incorrectly list Wedgwood Nowell as playing a character named Raymond McKim. This mistaken name credit was due to some early promotional material released by the studio before the film's final version was released. "J Lawrence Wilton ~~the President's general adviser" is the actual credit listing in the film. Nowell's character Wilton would become the Chief Antagonist in this film. This would be Nowell's only appearance in a Johnson film.
- David Kirby (1880–1954) (1880–1964) was born on July 16, 1880, in St. Louis, Missouri. The 42 year-old actor played Collins and would become one of the Heavies. Most movie databases for this film list David Kirby as playing Jack Smith. This mistake was also based on early promotional material released by the studio. The name of Kirby's character Collins is based on visuals from the actual movie when Kirby introduced himself as "Collins." Later in the movie, Wilton also refers to him as "Collins." Some sites incorrectly list the actor as David Dirby. David Kirby is the correct spelling. Kirby would appear in six Emory Johnson productions, the most of any actor in Johnson films.
- Taylor Graves (1896–1960) was born on May 28, 1896, in Alameda, California. The 26 year-old actor landed the role of the Buckley family's adopted son - Henry. His next appearance in a Johnson production would be The Mailman.
- Jennie (Jane) Morgan (1880–1972) was born on December 6, 1880, and raised in Boston, Massachusetts. The 42 year-old actress played Mrs. Bernard Miller, President Miller's wife and Esther's mother. This would be the last appearance of the actress in a Johnson film.

==== Director ====
Emory Johnson was a former actor turned director when he directed this film. He had acted in 73 movies between 1913 and 1922 for the likes of Essanay, Universal, Pathé, and Goldwyn before FBO allowed him to direct his first film. Johnson was 29 years old when he took charge of this production. During his directorial career at FBO, he would gain sobriquets like the "Master of Melodrama," "King of Exploitation," and "Hero of the Working Class." This melodrama would be added to all of the classifications. This film was the third film honoring his 8-picture contract with FBO. His two previous FBO films had all been financially successful – In the Name of the Law and The Third Alarm. Johnson would continue to thrive as an independent director because he didn't make epic films; he made bankable movies focusing on subjects he and his mother held dear.

==== Themes ====
What the world needs most today is a better understanding of humanity. What it wants are love and human sympathy. Thus, I have set out to make love the theme of all my productions. I have sought to show how whole families are lifted from sorrow to contentment by love and kindly sediments.

— Emory Johnson,

"Love, the greatest of human emotions, is the theme of Emory Johnson's drama, The Westbound Limited The film glorifies the Railroad Man. It shows him as a loyal, faithful, and brave human at his work, risking his life so that others might have safety"

"Bill Buckley, the westbound limited engineer, knows no creed but God, home, and duty. Duty the inspiring creed of the westbound limited"

The story centers on themes of love, devotion, family, integrity, duty, faithful, bravery, loyalty, sacrifice, and honor. (Note: What Is a Theme in Movies? "A theme is the film's central, unifying concept. A theme evokes a universal human experience and can be stated in one word or short phrase (for example, "love," "death," or "coming of age"). The theme may never be stated explicitly, but it is exemplified by the film's plot, dialogue, cinematography, and music.")

==== Screenplay ====
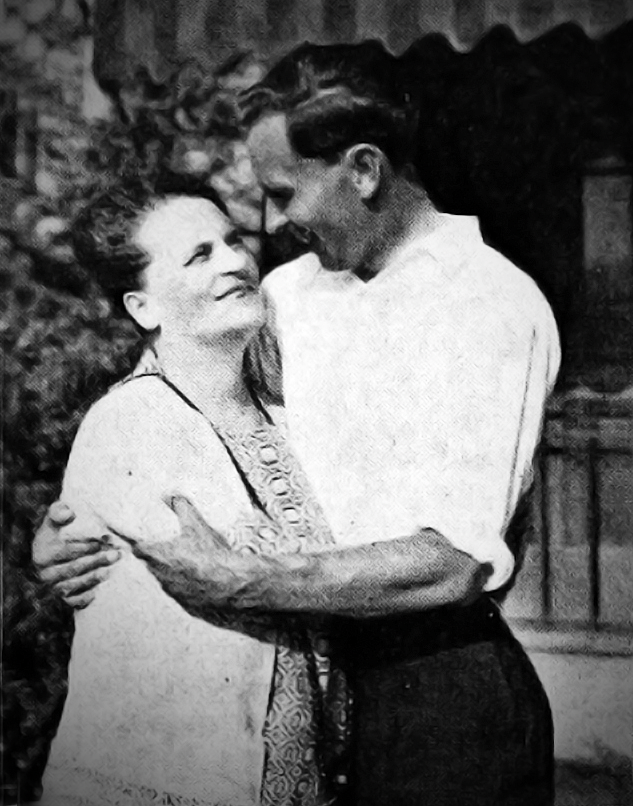
Emilie and Emory

To secure atmosphere for my railroad story, westbound limited, Emory and I have ridden in the engine cab, in the caboose, on the cowcatcher, and almost every place on the train that is an unusual one for a layman to occupy. We have visited the railroad yards, roundhouses, dispatchers' offices and have climbed into switch towers. We feel that this procedure enables us to work out the story's details more intelligently.

— Emilie Johnson,

Emilie Johnson (1867–1941) was 55 years old when she wrote the story for this film. Emilie Johnson was born on June 3, 1867, in Gothenburg, Västra Götaland, Sweden. After emigrating to America, she married Alfred Jönsson. Their only son was born in 1894 – Alfred Emory Johnson.

The West~Bound Limited was the third film in the 8-picture FBO contract. Emilie wrote both the story and the screenplay.

In the 1920s, Emilie Johnson and her son, director Emory Johnson, formed Hollywood's only mother-son writing/directing team, becoming the most financially successful directing and writing partnership in motion picture history to that point.

Emilie Johnson wrote stories about lunch pail characters living paycheck-to-paycheck like law enforcement officers, firefighters, mail carriers, railroad engineers, patriots, baseball players, and newspaper press operators. (Note: Emory Johnson said the following about his mother: My mother, Mrs. Emily Johnson, has that invaluable ability to cram human emotions into a photoplay. She has the ripened, matured viewpoint of the average mother. Sometimes I think mothers would make the greatest of all scenario writers because they have a particular human slant on life. Women are as well equipped as men to take up the important work of writing for the screen is already established by the success of many women writers who have fashioned their stories directly for the screen. The average woman has a deep and well-rounded understanding of life. She has little human qualities developed to a far greater degree than the average man.) Emilie Johnson felt her human-interest stories would be relatable on the silver screen and her son brought them to the screen in epic melodramas. (Note: The greatest appeal in pictures is not in extravagant spectacles, historical pageants, or adaptations of fairy tales. I think the straightforward, clean, wholesome Melodrama will always have the choice corner in the hearts of the American public.)

They usually worked side by side before production started and then on the movie sets after filming began. Mrs. Johnson supplied her son with stories that seemed custom-tailored for Ralph Lewis. Their unique collaboration produced melodramas until the late 1920s. By the early 1930s, their successes and box-office magic had ended.

=== Filming ===
Emory Johnson had Johnny Harron risk his life when filming one of the scenes in the movie. In the film, Johnny gallops away on his horse to warn the two trains about to collide. They reach the edge of a steep embankment. They must get to the bottom to flag the two trains. "What do you want me to do now?" Harron asked Mr. Johnson. " Why I simply want you to get on that horse and drop over that mountain – that is all," the Director replied. Then Harron asked: "Do I really have to do that?" With the cameras grinding, Harron mounted his horse and started his descent. The horse hesitated, and then over the bank they went.

==== Exteriors ====
Los Angeles, California provided the ideal environment for shooting the exteriors. Permission was received from one of the big terminals in the Los Angeles area to film the railroad scenes. A steam locomotive was chartered for several days by Johnson.

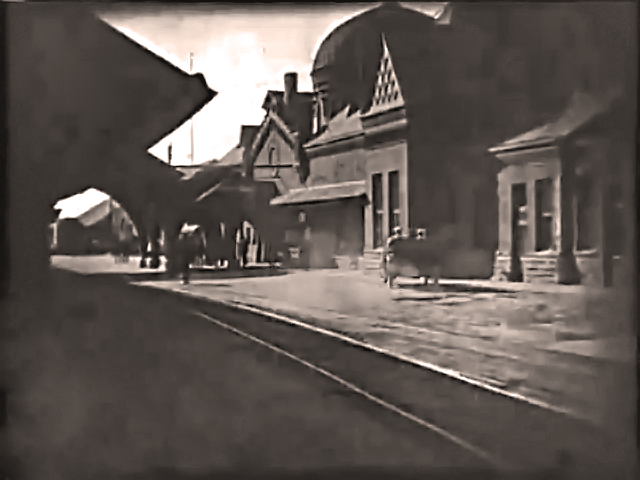
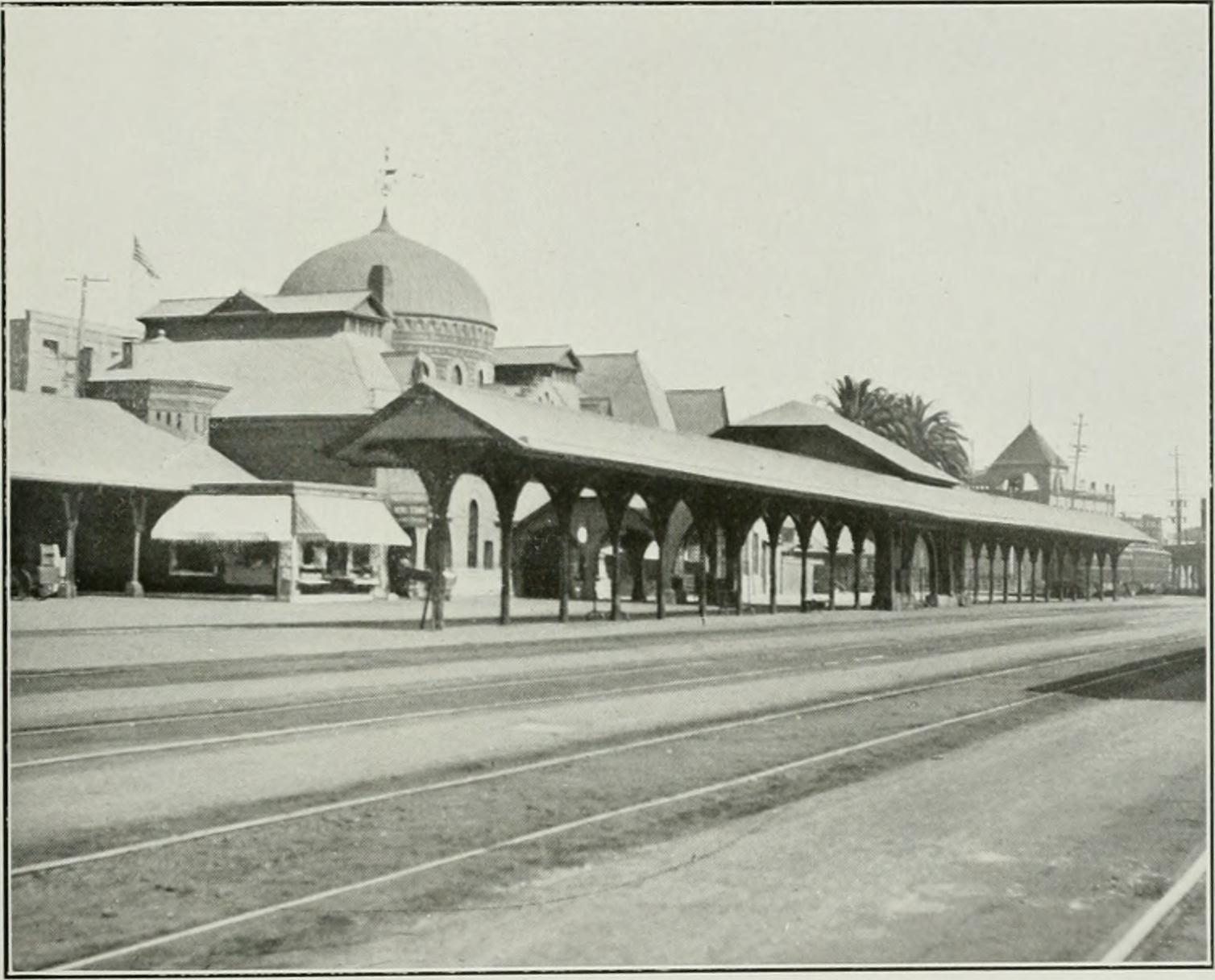
Passenger depot pictured in the movie is on the left
the Santa Fe La Grande Station is pictured on the right.

Bernard Miller is the President of the transcontinental railroad. Twelve minutes into the movie, Mr. and Mrs. Miller leave on a pre-planned trip. They departed from a train depot, which the movie frame allows us to identify the depot as the old Atchison, Topeka, and Santa Fe Railway passenger station in La Grande California. Identification of the train station is possible by examining the background of the movie frame, viewing the Moorish architecture dome, and comparing the structure against the La Grande images on Wikipedia. The Santa Fe opened La Grande Station on July 29, 1893. The movie was completed in 1923, making the station 30 years old at the time of the filming.

==== Interiors ====
Interiors were shot at the Robertson-Cole Studios at Melrose Avenue and Gower Street in Hollywood, CA.

"The American Cinematographer" credits Ross Fisher as the film's cameraman. The art director for this film is W. L. Heywood.

==== Schedule ====
The film schedule according to Camera! "Pulse of the Studios" and other authoritative sources. This schedule traces a film's evolution from Cradle-to-grave. This film started shooting in January 1923 and was In The Can April 1923. The Camera! timetable gives the studio and location as — R. C. Picture Corp located at Melrose and Gower.

The section also displayed the column headers and entries for this film:

Director	Star	Cameraman	Ass't Director	Scenarist	Type	Progress
Emory Johnson	All-Star	Ross Fisher	Wyatt	Emilie Johnson	Westbound 99	See table below

◆ Weekly progress timetable according Camera! "Pulse of the Studios" ◆
Year	Month	Day	Progress	Ref
1922	Dec		Collaborative effort begins between Emory Johnson and his mother to develop scenario	
1923	Jan		Principal photography started on Westbound 99	
1923	Jan	17	John Harron has completed his role Westbound 99	
1922	Jan	29	"Pulse of the Studios" stops listing Westbound 99	
1923	Feb	17	Taylor Graves has completed his role Westbound 99	
1923	Mar	24	Title changed from the working title of Westbound 99 to Westbound Limited	
1923	Apr	15	Westbound Limited release date	
1923	Apr	18	Westbound Limited shipped to New York for processing	

==== Working title ====
A working title, sometimes called a production title or a tentative title, is the temporary title of a product or project used during its development. This movie was shot under the working title of "Westbound 99." In March 1923, the working title was changed to a release title of "Westbound Limited."

Most reviewers and theater owners referenced the movie as "Westbound Limited." To add to the confusion, a 1937 movie was copyrighted under the name – WEST BOUND LIMITED by Universal Pictures Co on July 1, 1937,

Thus, we have the 1923 movie referred to in the printed media using one of the titles shown below:

Westbound 99	The Westbound Limited	Westbound Limited	West-bound limited
The West~Bound Limited	The West-Bound Limited	The West Bound Limited	West Bound Limited 1937 film

=== Post production ===
F.B.O. rewarded Ralph Lewis for his work in In the Name of the Law, The Third Alarm and The West~Bound Limited by signing him to a long-term contract in April 1923.

The various media of the time list the length of this film as 5,100 feet or 6,500 feet. These reel lengths equate to running times of 57 minutes or 67 minutes. This film's length in the copyright filing is seven reels or a running time of 77 minutes.

The Motion Picture News Check-up lists the length as 6,529 feet, rounded to 7 reels, or a running time of 72 minutes.

The actual preserved length of the movie is 5580 feet with a running time of 62 minutes.

==== Studios ====
As mentioned previously, Johnson signed an 8-picture contract with FBO. This film was the third film honoring the terms of that contract. In March 1926, Johnson released The Non-Stop Flight. This was the eighth and final film of his contractual obligation to FBO. It would be Emory and Emilie Johnson's last film for FBO. In April 1926, FBO decided to let Emory and Emilie Johnson's contracts expire. There were no published reasons for the separation. Emory Johnson's directorial career consisted of 13 films – 11 were silent, and two were Talkies.

== Release and reception ==
FBO policy was to produce pictures for Main Street's entertainment rather than the more sophisticated broadway tastes.

— Joe Kennedy,

Melodrama films have plots appealing to the raised passions of the audience. They concentrate on family issues, direct their attention to a victim's character, and develop the themes of duty and love. The format shows the characters working through their struggles with persistence, sacrificial deeds, and courage. Movie critics and theater owners often use the following expressions to describe the movies they are reviewing or showing.
Terms used in reviewing silent movie melodrama

=== New York showing ===
On Thursday, April 26, 1923, Film Booking Offices of America invited critics from the New York Daily News, fan magazines, assorted trade papers, and leaders of the top movie houses to a presentation at the New York Astor Hotel. They were treated to the first screening at Emory Johnson's latest film, "Westbound Limited." Most attendees were impressed and predicted future success.
In addition, special screenings were scheduled for local railroad executives and railway organizations in other cities with the same impetus of getting these industry leaders on board and having them give the movie free advertising and promotion. The attitude of the railway officials is that this picture is the first photoplay that has ever put the roads up to the public in the right light.

=== Official release ===
On April 15, 1923, THE WEST-BOUND LIMITED was copyrighted to R-C (Robertson-Cole) Pictures Corp with a registration number of LP18949. (Note: The copyright was filed with U.S. Copyright Office and entered into the record as shown: THE WEST~BOUND LIMITED. Released by Film Booking Offices of America. 1923. 7 Reels Credits: Director, Emory Johnson; story, and scenario, Emilie Johnson. R-C Pictures Corp,. 15Apr23; LP18949.) The copyrights for FBO Films were registered with their original British owners. FBO was the official name of the film-distributing operation for Robertson-Cole Pictures Corp. Joseph P. Kennedy Sr. would rectify this confusion at a later date.

The film was officially released on April 15, 1923, by Film Booking Offices of America.

=== Advertising ===
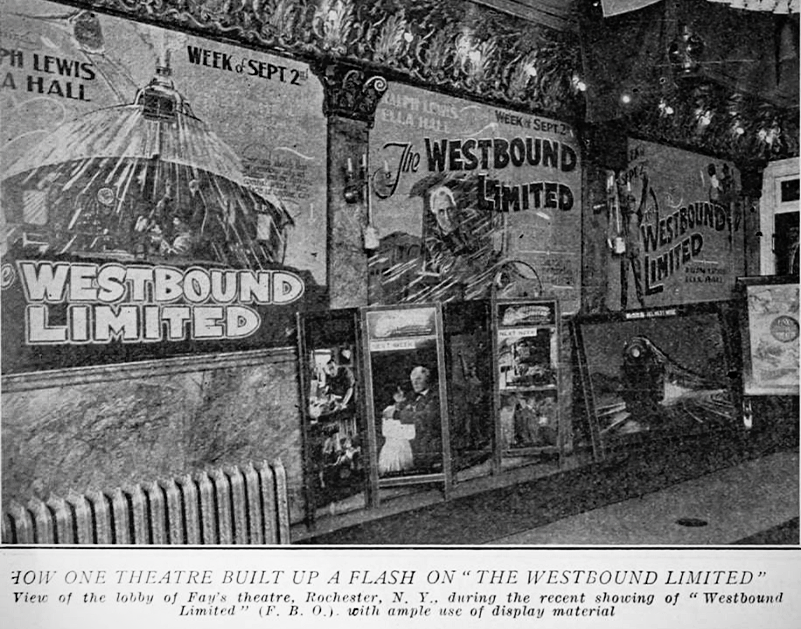
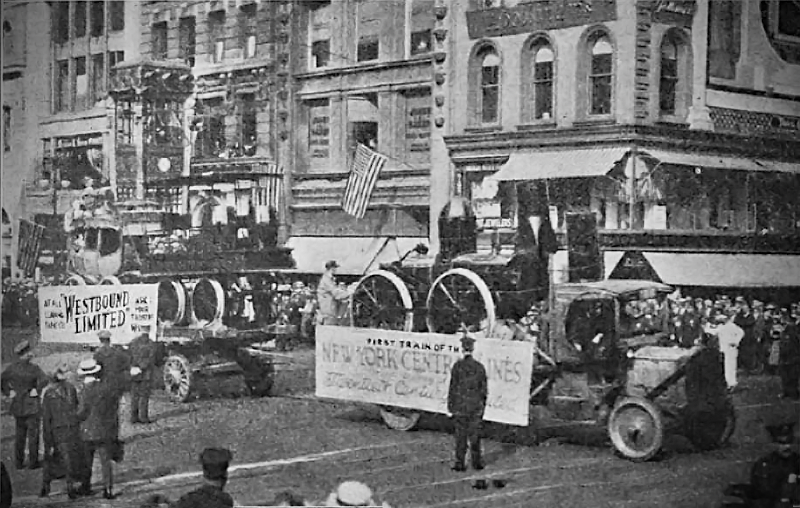

In the 1920s, there were over 1.7 million rail employees nationwide. FBO saw a vast potential market in railroad employees. Westbound limited hoped to gather support from this segment of the working force to promote their film.

Film Booking Offices implemented the same advertising strategy they used in promoting In the Name of the Law and The Third Alarm especially creating local tie-ins with the particular working-class or public servants portrayed in the movie.

As shown in the graphic, F.B.O. was allowed to drape a 60-foot Westbound Limited banner over a vintage New York Central railroad engine entered in New York's 1923 Silver Jubilee parade on Fifth Avenue.

National tie-ups would be used utilized locally in exploiting Westbound Limited have been made by the publicity department of Film Booking Offices with some of the big railroad companies. The exploitation is to be handled by the railroads. Several big railroad companies created national tie-ups that would be used locally. This exploitation was handled by the railroads e.g. Pennsylvania Railroad and Baltimore and Ohio Railroad distributed special time-tables which had "Westbound Limited" advertising printed on its reverse side. The Pennsylvania Railroad also printed over a million postcards featuring the words, See Westbound Limited which were distributed by their agents all along with their trans-continental trains. Many western railroads had allowed free advertising posters in their stations.

Taking a page from the advertising playbook of his first two movies, "the Canton, Ohio Women's Auxiliary of the Brotherhood of Railroad Trainmen, has taken a big block of tickets for Westbound Limited and will sell them, keeping a small percentage of the profits for their own organization. Similar arrangements have been made for selling tickets in Youngstown, Ohio and other towns where The Westbound Limited will play."

If the theater owners had questions about exploiting this movie, FBO would provide a 22-page newspaper-size campaign book.

==== Exhibitor advertising ====
One theater owner in Seattle was especially creative. Attendees were greeted by a large cutout of Ralph Lewis standing with his arm upheld before the cross-sign warning "Stop — Listen — See Westbound Limited." The theatre owner then, "attired all his girl ushers in engineers' costumes. Each girl wore a black corduroy cap, blue corduroy overalls, and a white silk shirt. Over their arms, they carried small electric lanterns. Lanterns in one aisle would be green and in the next aisle red."

=== Reviews ===
Movie reviews were critical opinions for theater owners and fans. Critiques of movies printed in different trade journals were vital in determining whether to book or watch the movie. Movie critics' evaluations of this film were mixed. When critics have divergent reviews, deciding whether to see or book the film can be challenging, especially since mixed reviews do not mean it is a bad movie. In the end, it boils down to personal choices and how much value you place in the movie review and the reviewer. Movie critics and theater owners often use the following expressions to describe the movies they are reviewing or showing.
Terms used in reviewing silent movie melodrama

==== Critical response ====
Small towns were FBO mainstays versus big cities. The movie received positive reviews. Most small-town and large-city venues enjoyed the movie.

- Chester J. Smith reviewed the movie in the May 5, 1923 issue of Motion Picture News, stating:

It tells an interesting story. However, by no means a new one, it provides many thrills that are keener in their anticipation than in their realization. There is no getting away from the fact that it stirs you up at times, but there is something in the climaxes that do not register as heavily as you are prepared for.

- The film was reviewed in the July 6, 1923 issue of the Glendale Daily Press:

Catapultic, as the crack train itself, around which the plot is woven, "Westbound Limited" crashed through the screen at the T.D. & L. theater yesterday and left capacity audiences are gasping. A photographic effect never before witnessed on the screen, and which for sheer realism discounted everything yet devised by the ingenuity of director and cameraman, was the picturing of an express train running full tilt directly at the audience, neither swerving to left nor right and then – just think – continuing right over the heads of the audience, seemingly, as they looked on the screen agape.

==== Audience response ====
FBO focused on producing and distributing films for small-town venues. They served this market melodramas, non-Western action pictures, and comedic shorts. These moviehouse reviews were critical for a distributor like FBO. Unlike many major Hollywood studios, FBO did not own its theaters. Like most independents, FBO was dependent on the moviehouse owners to rent their films for the company to show a profit.

These are brief published observations from moviehouse owners. Theater owners would subscribe to various movie magazines, read the movie critic's reviews, then read the theater owner's reports. These reviews would assist them in deciding if the film was a potential moneymaker in their venue.

- C.G.Couch, Grand Theatre (288 seats) Carnegie, Pennsylvania population 11,516
  Star cast. Very good picture. Helped pay for the poor ones. Packed to the doors. Has a very good moral tone and is suitable at any time. Had good attendance. Draw mixed class in a city of 12,000. Admission 10-25
- Owner, Goodwin & Hilton, Park Theatre Sioux City, Iowa population 71,227
  Everything that has been said about it is O.K. only not good enough. Gave a money-back guarantee and not a kick. Neighborhood Patronage
- David City, Nebraska population 2,250
  Star cast. Very nice entertainment. Plenty of excitement. Tone, good. Sunday or special, no. Appeal, 75%. Draw general class
- Melville, Louisiana population 1,000
  All-star cast, but all the stars were unknown. One of FBO Gold Bonds, and it is pipin for those who like melodrama. Plenty of good acting and the world's of action, with several thrills that make 'em sit up in their seats—some splendid photographic shots from an airplane. Little town men, this pie is made for you to serve. Sunday, yes Special, not quite. Appeal, very strong. Draw all types.

=== Box office ===
The West~Bound Limited earned $225,697 (equivalent to $3,653,779 in 2021)

== Preservation status ==
Although the majority of silent films did not survive, (Note: With every foot of film that is lost, we lose a link to our culture, to the world around us, to each other, and ourselves – Martin Scorsese, filmmaker A report by Library of Congress film historian and archivist David Pierce estimates that: around 75% of original silent-era films have perished; 14% of the 10,919 silent films released by major studios exist in their original 35 mm or other formats; 11% survive only in full-length foreign versions or film formats of lesser image quality.; Many silent-era films did not survive for reasons as explained on this Wikipedia page.) this film was preserved through chance. According to the Library of Congress website, this film has a status of: "Digital files produced from 16mm print on loan from a private collector." (Note: Copy of the LOC listing Director: Emory Johnson Star: Ralph Lewis (Bill Buckley) Archive: UCLA Film And Television Archive (Los Angeles) [Usl], Filmoteca de la UNAM (México) [Mxu], Academy Film Archive (Beverly Hills) [Usf], Library of Congress [Washington], [Usw] Copyright claimant: Emory Johnson Productions Registration number: Lp18949 Holdings: U.S. Archive Studio: R-C/FBO Completeness: incomplete Completeness: abridgement Format: 35mm dupe neg: Mxu 16 mm: Usl Digital files: Usw Note: Digital files produced from 16mm print on loan from private collector: Usw Record No.: 42315)

The film is available on YouTube and from various DVD vendors.

== Gallery ==
=== Principal Players and Director ===
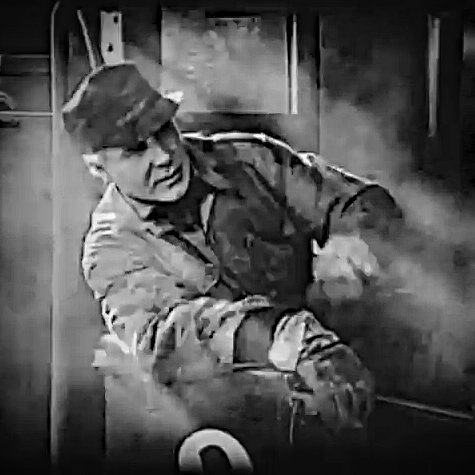
Ralph Lewis
Bill Buckley

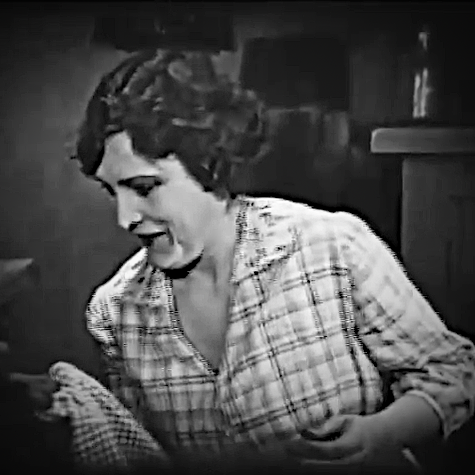
Claire McDowell
Mrs. Bill Buckley

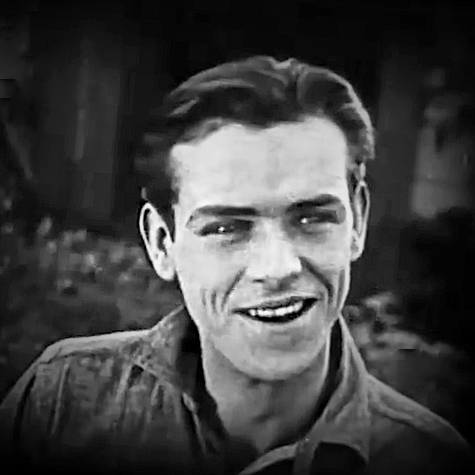
John Harron
Johnny Buckley

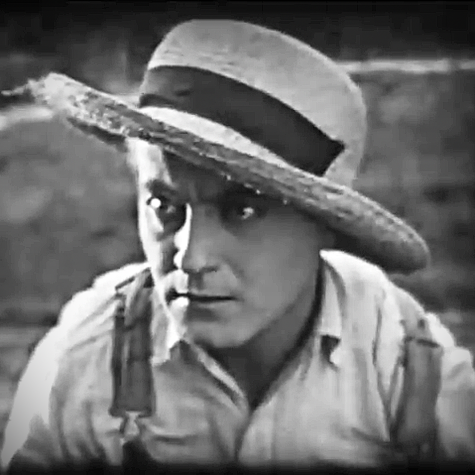
Taylor Graves
Henry

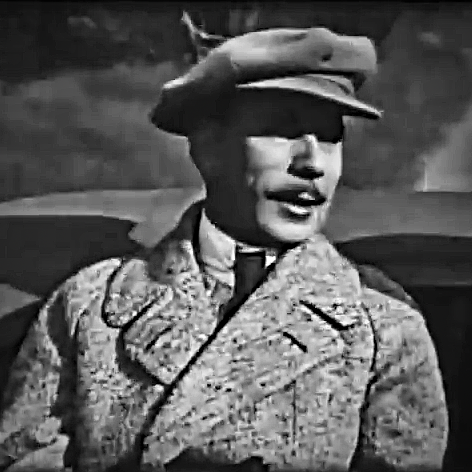
Wedgwood Nowell
J. Lawrence Wilton

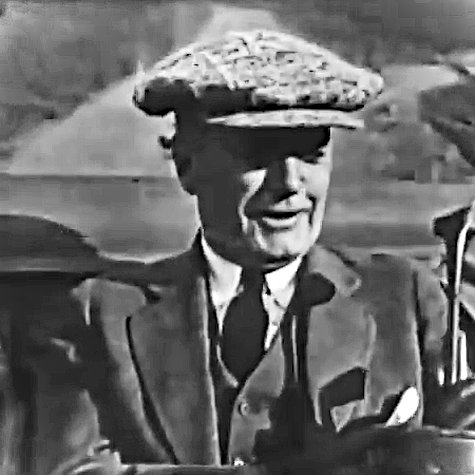
Richard Morris
Bernard Miller

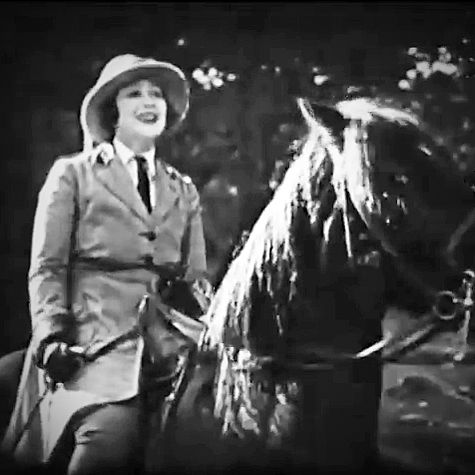
Jane Morgan
Mrs. Bernard Miller

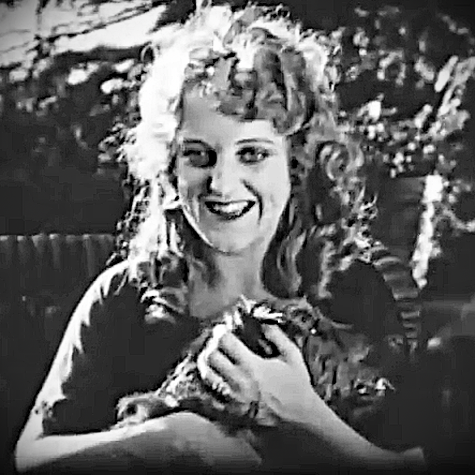
Ella Hall
Esther Miller

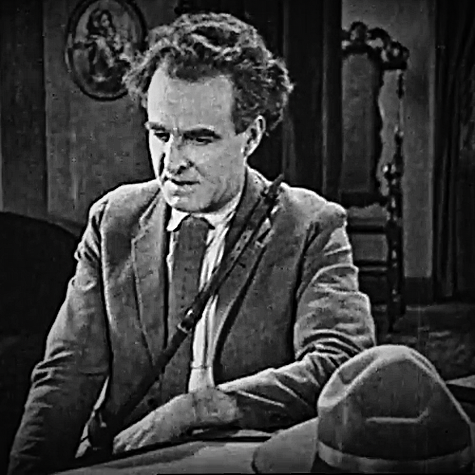
Jack Smith

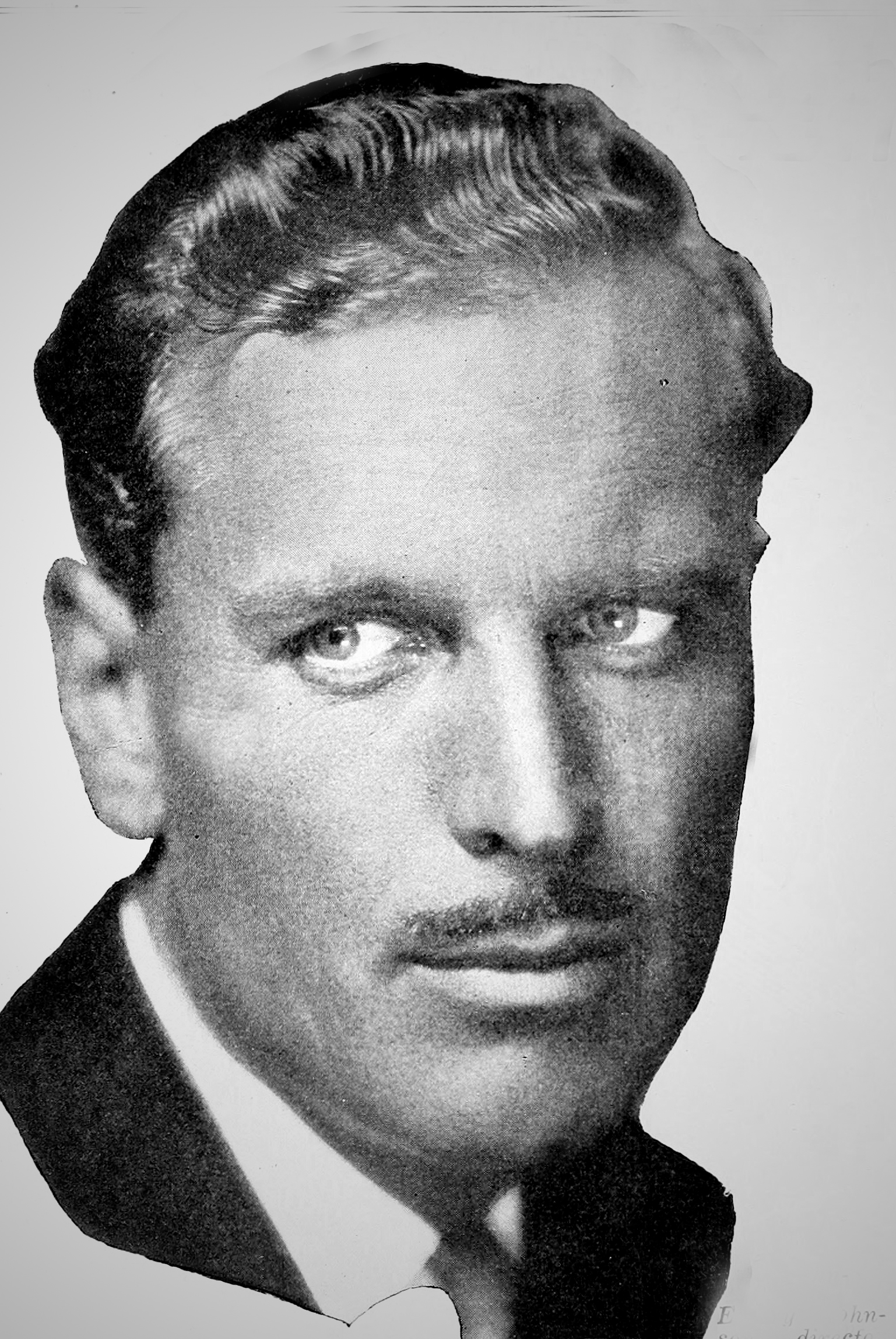
Emory Johnson
Director

== Bibliography ==
- Goodwin, Doris Kearns (1991). The Fitzgeralds and the Kennedys: An American Saga. Manhattan, New York City: St. Martin's Press. p. 932. ISBN 978-0-312-06354-2. "Book Two: The Kennedys (1915-1940) - Chapter 20 This is a gold mine"
- Lasky, Betty (1984). RKO The Biggest Little Major of Them All. Englewood Cliffs, NJ: Prentice-Hall. p. 14. ISBN 0-13-781451-8.
- Sherwood, Robert Emmet (January 1, 1923). The Best Moving Pictures of 1922-1923 also WHO'S WHO IN THE MOVIES and the YEARBOOK OF THE AMERICAN SCREEN. Boston, MA: Small, Maynard & Company. p. 345. Archived from the original on February 22, 2012. "Record of the Motion Pictures release between June 1, 1922, and June 1, 1923"
- Limbacher, James L (1974). Feature films on 8mm and 16mm: A directory of feature films available for rental, sale and lease in the United States, with serials and directors' indexes. New York: R.R. Bowker Company. p. 368. ISBN 978-0835207096. "Brief listings of feature motion pictures available in non-theatrical reduction prints in 1973."

== American Film Institute cast links ==
- Ralph Lewis
- Clair McDowell
- John Harron
- Ella Hall
- David Kirby
- Taylor Graves
- Wedgewood Nowell
- Richard Morris
- Emory Johnson
- Emilie Johnson
