= In the Name of the Law (1922 film) =

1922 American melodrama by Emory Johnson

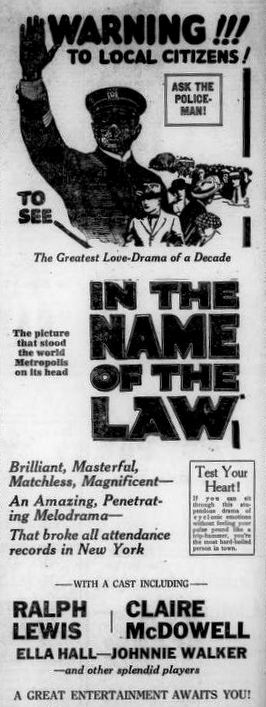
- Newspaper ad
- Directed by: Emory Johnson
- Screenplay by: Emilie Johnson
- Story by: Emilie Johnson
- Produced by: Emory Johnson Productions
- Starring: Ralph Lewis; Claire McDowell
- Cinematography: Ross Fisher
- Color process: Black and White
- Distributed by: Film Booking Offices of America
- Release date: August 22, 1922
- Running time: 6-7 reels (65 minutes)
- Country: United States
- Languages: Silent (English intertitles); Titles by Carol Owen
- Box office: $600,000 (equivalent to $11,540,755 in 2025)

In the Name of the Law is a 1922 American silent melodrama directed by Emory Johnson with Dick Posson acting as assistant director. FBO released the film in August 1922. The film's "All-Star" cast included Ralph Lewis, Johnnie Walker, and Claire McDowell. The cast also included Johnson and his wife, Ella Hall. Emilie Johnson, Johnson's mother, wrote both the story and screenplay. In the Name of the Law was the first picture in Johnson's eight-picture contract with FBO.

The police melodrama was about a San Francisco police officer. He was a dedicated community servant. The story depicts his struggles with the duality of dedication to duty versus devotion to family. The film was a pioneering effort in other aspects. It was a serious film about law enforcement. Movies had cinematically maligned the profession in the past. The film is also an early example of an innovative exploitation strategy. The scheme involved getting the group featured on the screen aligned with their real-life counterparts and promoting the film.

== Plot ==
=== Prologue ===
The story's prologue opens when policeman Patrick O'Hara discovers a lost child. She has stolen some milk. Rather than disciplining her, he takes her home instead. The following morning, he finds the girl has run away from an orphanage. Since their baby daughter had died, the O'Haras made plans to adopt the child. The prologue then moves on and features the O'Haras' sons. Ben Alexander plays a young Harry O'Hara at age 10. Harry's younger brother, portrayed by Johnny Thompson, plays Johnnie O'Hara at 9. Josephine Adair plays their recently adopted six-year-old daughter Mary.

=== 12 years later ===
After a single subtitle, the story jumps 12 years into the future. Harry is now age 22. He attends college, studying Law hoping to become a lawyer. His lofty goals run contrary to his father's wishes. His father has told his son he has "wasted his time getting an education". Johnnie is age 20 and works at the local bank. Mary, age 18, is also employed at the same bank as a stenographer. Johnnie and Mary have fallen in love and planned their wedding. We also discover that O'Haras have always wanted to own a cottage. The family's frugality has finally come to fruition. They are only one payment away from paying off the mortgage.

While attending law school, Harry earns pocket money by pressing clothes. He also washes dishes. One day, while Harry is at work, somebody leaves a sizable sum of money in a pair of pants needing pressing. The money goes missing, and the owner accuses Harry of the theft. The owner reports the thief to the police—the police file charges. Upon hearing of the accusation, Harry's mother becomes distraught. She had been secretly funding Harry while he attended law school. In her heart, she knew he couldn't have committed this crime. Mother O'Hare hatches a plan to keep her eldest out of jail. She will take the money they had saved for their final payment on the cottage and pass it to Harry. Harry will "find" the missing money and return it to the owner.

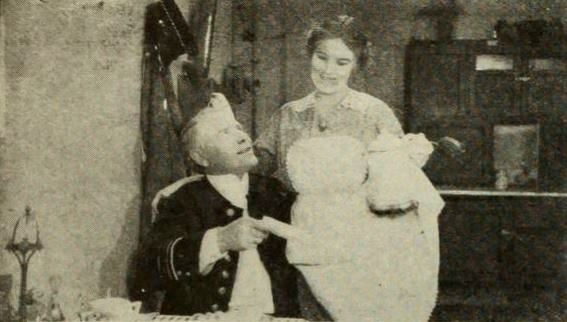

While the family is at home, sans Harry, Pat discovers what his wife has done with their cottage money to save Harry. A massive argument breaks out. When things settle down, everyone goes their separate ways. While Officer O'Hare goes to work, Mary goes to the bank and approaches the bank president. Mr. Lucus, to ask for a loan. Mr. Lucus agrees to give her the money. But as she finds out, he expects special favors besides the regular repayment. Johnnie takes another tact to help his brother. He decides to tap into a stash of funds stored in his safety deposit box. After securing the funds, Johnnie heads home to find the house empty.

Where is everybody? Officer O'Hara is at work, Mother O'Hara is with Harry, and Mary is begging for a loan. He heads back to the bank. Johnnie finds out Mary is flush with cash. He believes she has stolen the money from the bank to save Harry. A quarrel breaks out. Now, Johnnie decides to use the funds from his safety deposit box to cover his girlfriend's theft. How could wholesome Mary steal this money? He starts investigating this supposed theft by looking around the bank. Johnnie then heads to the back of the bank, further investigating.

The scene switches. The bank is being robbed! Mary's screams alert the bank officials a crime is being committed. Somebody calls the cops. Police rush to the bank. Leading the police continent is Officer Pat O'Hare. After the police arrive, a policeman gets killed in a shoot-out with the robbers. The holdup is thwarted, and all action stops. Twenty-five years on the force have taught Officer O'Hara to examine all crime scenes. He performs his due diligence at the crime scene. Officer O'Hare checks the entire bank and then walks around to the back of the bank. In the heat of the moment, he believes he has found another one of the robbers. Officer O'Hare fires a single shot. Then to his absolute horror, he realizes he has wounded his son - Johnnie.

The story switches to the trial of Johnnie O'Hara for robbery and murder. The prosecutor's case depends only on circumstantial evidence. Be that as it may, Johnnie is still on the verge of conviction on all counts. A new lawyer for the defense appears. The new counselor is Johnnie's brother Harry, a full-fledged lawyer. Harry immediately makes a passionate plea for his brother. Harry's eloquence strikes everyone in the courtroom. Then, Harry finds new direct evidence. The latest proof exonerates his brother completely - thank you, Mary!

Then, as a precursor to similar scenes from the TV series Perry Mason, the Bank President, Mr. Lucus, stands up. Overcome with guilt after hearing Harry's appeals, he confesses to the robbery. Then he confesses to killing the policeman. Even after his confession, Mr. Lucus is still unable to control his emotions of guilt. He approaches the bench. While facing the judge, Mr. Lucus pulls a gat and shoots himself.

When the trial concludes, the court dismisses Johnnie's charges. As a side note, the criminal charges filed against Harry are tossed. When the movie closes, the family believes their luck has improved. They are convinced misfortune will no longer deal with bad cards.

The storyline construction used several sources.

== Cast ==
| Actor | Role |
|---|---|
Prologue
| Ben Alexander | Harry O'Hara age 10 |
| Johnny Thompson | Johnnie O'Hara age 8 |
| Josephine Adair | Mary age 6 |
12 years later
| Ralph Lewis | Patrick O'Hara |
| Claire McDowell | Mrs. O'Hara |
| Emory Johnson | Harry O'Hara age 22 |
| Johnnie Walker | Johnnie O'Hara age 20 |
| Ella Hall | Mary age 18 |
| Richard Morris | Mr. Lucus |

== Production ==
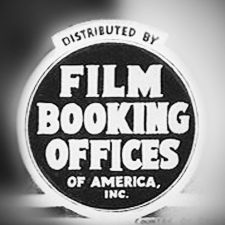
FBO logo

Film Booking Offices of America (FBO) was an energetic, independent American silent era film studio. The company released around 110 features and shorts a year. The company focused on producing low-budget films emphasizing first-class westerns, action films, romantic melodramas, and comedy shorts. The company mainly distributed its pictures to small-town venues and independent theater chains, which changed their pictures three times a week. FBO would make their pictures appeal to every member of the American family.

The average cost per FBO production was $50,000 to $75,000 equivalent to $961,730 to $1,442,594 in 2021 compared to the Major film studios which could spend five times as much to produce a movie.

FBO also produced and distributed a limited number of big-budget features labeled "Gold Bond" or "Special" productions.

=== Pre production ===
==== Development ====
Emory Johnson, at the time one of the silver screen's leading men, had recently returned to the San Francisco Bay area to make another movie based on a story by his mother, Emilie Johnson. He decided to visit his mother, who lived in the general vicinity. While driving down San Francisco's Market Street en route, he failed to stop at an intersection. A police officer pulled him to the side. Emory immediately noticed the policeman's cheerful demeanor. He wondered about the officer's home life and how it affected his work. He discussed the idea with his mother, an experienced scenarist, and soon after that, she started to write "The Midnight Call."

==== Casting ====
- Ralph Lewis (1872–1931) was born on October 8, 1872, in Englewood, Illinois. The 49 year-old actor landed the leading man role in this production. He played a rugged middle-aged Police Officer, Patrick O'Hara. He would have future starring roles in Johnson vehicles, including The Third Alarm, The Mailman, and The Last Edition. The Last Edition was Lewis's fifth and final film in a Johnson production.

Lewis's film debut came in 1911. Lewis appeared in 160 films between 1912 and 1938. Lewis will always be remembered for his role as abolitionist U.S. Representative Austin Stoneman in D. W. Griffith's The Birth of a Nation (1915) and the governor in Intolerance (1916). (Note: A 1924 article in Camera! noted, "Ralph Lewis, since starting his career in motion pictures with D. W. Griffith at the old Biograph company thirteen years ago, has played in one hundred and fourteen screen dramas, ranging from the split-reelers put out by the Biograph and including the big Griffith special twelve-reel features like 'Intolerance' and 'The Birth of a Nation'. He has played the role of a judge seven times, a politician ten times, a police officer three times, and has portrayed a ship captain twice. He has committed twenty-seven murders and incidentally was killed thirty times. Lewis has been before the camera in twenty-two deathbed scenes. He has fought numerous duels and has gone down with sinking boats on three occasions. He has played father to almost all of the big screen stars, including Mary Pickford, Norma and Constance Talmadge, Alice Terry, Lillian Gish, and many others. However, he has never played the role of a farmer.") The June 5, 1923, edition of the Poughkeepsie Eagle-News observed, "Ralph Lewis, is especially good in parts built upon strength of character ..."
In a newspaper interview, Ralph Lewis said - "I lived the life of a cop for three months and from now on I'm through roasting them." He also added "I directed traffic on a main corner in San Francisco for only one hour and I went home and slept for the rest of the day.

- Johnnie Walker (1894–1949) was born on January 7, 1894, in New York City, New York. He was an upcoming star when the 28 year-old actor was awarded the supporting role of Johnnie O'Hara, age 20, Patrick O'Hara's son. Walker appeared in five Johnson FBO productions. In every production, he played the son of the working-class father. Walker would be featured in Johnson's sixth film for FBO – Life's Greatest Game, released in October 1924. Life's Greatest Game was Walker's fifth and final role in an Emory Johnson production. Walker is five feet eleven inches tall, with black hair and blue eyes. AFI credits the actor with 48 Titles in his Filmography.
- Claire McDowell (1877–1966) was born on November 2, 1877, in New York City. The 44 year-old actress was an established star when she assumed the role of Mrs. Patrick O'Hara, the mother of Harry O'Hara and Johnnie O'Hara. She would also play another mother figure in Johnson's third film, the 1923 production for FBO – The West~Bound Limited. She would make appearances in a total of four Emory Johnson productions.
- Ella Hall (1896–1981) was born on March 17, 1896, in Hoboken, New Jersey. Johnson chose Ella Hall to play the female lead in this movie. She was 26. Josephine Adair played 6-year-old Mary in the Prologue. Hall acted as the adult Mary, now 18. Hall's last film was the 15-part serial production of The Great Reward, released on May 9, 1921. Her husband, Emory Johnson, coaxed her out of domestic life to take the feminine leads in this film and his following two FBO productions – The Third Alarm and The West~Bound Limited.

After wrapping The West~Bound Limited, she landed a role in the 1923 production of Lloyd B. Carleton's The Flying Dutchman. It would become one of her best-known performances. After filming The Dutchman, Hall retired from silent movies to focus on her two boys and her rocky marriage to Emory Johnson. She came out of retirement to accept uncredited roles in the films Madam Satan, released in 1930, and The Bitter Tea of General Yen, released in 1932.

- Richard (Dick) Morris (1862–1924) was born on January 30, 1862, in Charlestown, Massachusetts. The 60 year-old actor played Mr. Lucus. Morris usually played character roles and heavies. His early education included spending three years overseas studying grand opera. His first professional work was touring America for two seasons as an opera singer. He then spent three years in London singing opera. In September 1909, he joined the Lubin organization and made his first movie appearance in 1912 when he was 50.

Morris would act in Johnson's next production, the 1922 film – The Third Alarm. He would also appear in future Johnson productions, The Mailman and The Spirit of the USA, before his untimely death in October 1924.

- Josephine Adair (1921–1966) was born on June 27, 1916, in Lamar, Colorado. Adair was 6 when she acted in the role of Mary (Age 6). She was an established child star when filming started on this production. Josephine Adair was the younger sister of another child actress, Elizabeth Adair. A newspaper article recounted one Adair story. Emory Johnson was losing light for a particular scene he was shooting. Filming part of the prologue required Josephine Adair to cry. She could not evoke a tear flow on her own, so Emory took matters into his own hands. Read about his clever solution in this newspaper article.

==== Director ====
What the world needs most today is a better understanding of humanity. What it wants are love and human sympathy. Thus, I have set out to make love the theme of all my productions. I have sought to show how whole families are lifted from sorrow to contentment by love and kindly sediments.

— Emory Johnson
Director,

Emory Johnson was a former actor turned filmmaker when he oversaw this film. Johnson was 28 years old when he finished this film. In the Name of the Law was his directorial debut.

Johnson began his acting career in 1912. He secured work as an extra in early Broncho Billy Westerns. He acted in 73 movies between 1912 and 1922 for the likes of Essanay, Universal, Pathé, and Goldwyn. In 1921, he thought the time was right to start directing movies. Before FBO even considered allowing a neophyte to direct his first film, Johnson had to convince them to finance a non-comedic movie about police officers. FBO was afraid the public would not like the serious side of cops, especially as a full-length movie. He finally convinced them and completed his film. The movie was a financial success.

During his career at FBO, he would earn titles like the "Master of Melodrama", "King of Exploitation", and "Hero of the Working Class". They would include this drama in all the categories. (Note: We have come to the day when the public is demanding- consistent, human stories. We do not believe that the American people want to see only pictures of the ultra-rich. Our characters in The Midnight Call are simple folk — belonging to the great Ameri- can middle class. The drama and comedy of their lives will reflect the emotions of the great majority of picturegoers. It is the human note that makes the picture today. It is that quality of sincerity that makes the drama ring true. Surely the industry has had this proved to them in the past year. The biggest successes have not been the pictures with the biggest sets — but they have been the pictures with the most human stories. Emory Johnson Director) Johnson would continue to thrive as an independent director because he did not just make epic films; he made bankable movies focusing on subjects he and his mother held dear.

==== Themes ====
The leading theme of this film was to portray law enforcement in a whole new light. Police were no longer shown as bumbling stumblebums featured in the trendy comedic short subject films of the early part of the 1900s, e.g. Keystone Cops. This movie would portray cops first as family men – real men trying to balance raising a family with the dangerous profession as guardians of the Law. It would also show an officer of the Law must sometimes seek resolution and balance between enforcing the Law, no matter the circumstances, versus the heartfelt obligations of a family man and father. This duality became the central theme of the film.

==== Screenplay ====
"The greatest appeal in pictures is not in extravagant spectacles, historical pageants, or adaptation of fairy tales. I think the straight-forward, clean, wholesome Melodrama will always have the choice corner in the hearts of the American public."

— Writer Emilie Johnson,

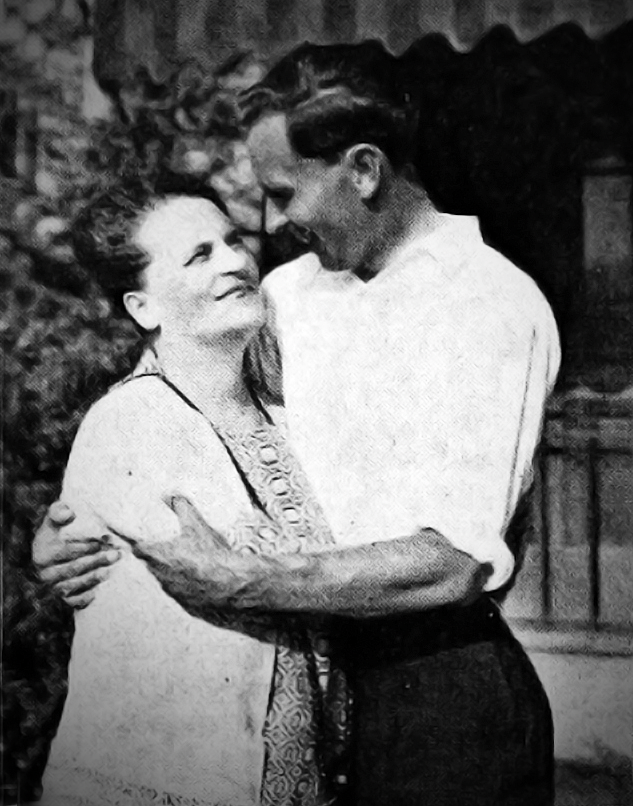
Emilie Johnson and her son Emory, from 1923

Emilie Johnson (1867–1941) was 55 years old when she wrote the story for this film. Emilie Johnson was born on June 3, 1867, in Gothenburg, Västra Götaland, Sweden. After emigrating to America, she married Alfred Jönsson. Their only son was born in 1894 – Alfred Emory Johnson.

In the Name of the Law was the first picture in her contract with FBO. Emilie wrote the story and the screenplay. Emilie discussed the film with The Butte Miner newspaper, saying, "When I wrote 'In the Name of the Law' I spend several weeks around the police station and in the police courts. I also attended the police convention in San Francisco."

In the 1920s, Emilie and Emory Johnson developed one of the unique collaborations in the annals of Hollywood. The decade saw the mother-son team develop into the most financially successful directing and writing team in motion picture history. She wrote most of the stories and screenplays her son used for his career in directing melodramas. Emilie Johnson wrote stories about lunch pail characters living paycheck-to-paycheck like law enforcement officers, firefighters, mail carriers, railroad engineers, patriots, baseball players, and newspaper press operators. (Note: Emory Johnson said the following about his mother: My mother, Mrs. Emily Johnson, has that invaluable ability to cram human emotions into a photoplay. She has the ripened, matured viewpoint of the average mother. Sometimes I think mothers would make the greatest of all scenario writers because they have a particular human slant on life. Women are as well equipped as men to take up the important work of writing for the screen is already established by the success of many women writers who have fashioned their stories directly for the screen. The average woman has a deep and well-rounded understanding of life. She has little human qualities developed to a far greater degree than the average man.) Emilie Johnson felt her human-interest stories would be relatable on the silver screen and her son brought them to the screen in epic melodramas. (Note: The greatest appeal in pictures is not in extravagant spectacles, historical pageants, or adaptations of fairy tales. I think the straightforward, clean, wholesome Melodrama will always have the choice corner in the hearts of the American public.)

They usually worked side by side before production started and then on the movie sets after filming began. Mrs. Johnson supplied her son with stories that seemed custom-tailored for Ralph Lewis. Their unique collaboration would persist through the decade, fading in the early 30s.

=== Filming ===
This movie was filmed entirely in San Francisco, California. Some sources indicate both Ross Fisher ASC and Henry Sharp ASC handled the cinematography. Camera!'s "Pulse of the Studios" credits the cameraman as "Fisher-Mickle". The cameraman was Ross Fisher.

==== Schedule ====
The film schedule according to Camera! "Pulse of the Studios". This schedule traces a film's evolution from Cradle-to-grave. This film started shooting in late November 1921 and was "in the can" April 1922. The timetable gives the studio and location as United Studios located at 53441 Melrose.

The section also displayed the column headers and entries for this film:

| Director | Star | Cameraman | Ass't Director | Scenarist | Type | Progress |
|---|---|---|---|---|---|---|
| Emory Johnson | All-Star | Fisher-Mickle | Dick Rosson | Emory Johnson | The Midnight Call | See table below |

◆ Shooting Schedule according to Camera! "Pulse of the Studios" ◆
| Year | Month | Day | Progress | Ref |
|---|---|---|---|---|
| 1921 | Nov | 28 | Principal photography began this week on The Midnight Call at the United Studios in Los Angeles, California. | |
| 1921 | Dec | 10 | "Emory Johnson will leave shortly for San Francisco to film scenes for The Midnight Call." | |
| 1921 | Dec | 31 | 2nd through 5th week of shooting The Midnight Call. This is the final listing for shooting Exteriors | |
| 1922 | Jan | 28 | 1st through 4th week of post-production | |
| 1922 | Feb | 25 | 5th through 8th week of post-production | |
| 1922 | Mar | 4 | 9th and final week of post-production | |
| 1922 | Mar | 25 | 1st through 3rd week of finishing | |
| 1922 | Mar | 31 | The film had "undergone final revision and will be shipped East early next week." | |
| 1922 | Apr | 8 | 4th and final week of revisions | |
| 1922 | Jun | 17 | First public announcement of renamed film In the Name of the Law. FBO states that the movie will be released as a fall special. | |

==== Working title ====
The film was produced under the working title The Midnight Call. The article in Motion Picture News suggests that the title was changed to In the Name of the Law sometime in June 1922. This new title was used for the film's premiere in New York on July 9, 1922.

Another alternate title for this movie is incorrectly listed as The Discard or Discard. The mix-up probably occurred because filming started on The Discard (name later changed to The Third Alarm) in July 1922. This date would coincide with the July 9 premiere of In the Name of the Law.

=== Post-production ===
==== Studios ====
The film's controlling studio is listed as "United Studios", not "R-C Studio". The United Studios advertisement states - "... the unlimited facilities, equipment, and highly specialized staff have made the United Studios the most economically operated motion picture plant available to independent producers." The explanation for this is R-C would not have its filming facilities until 1922.

== Release and reception ==
=== New York premiere ===
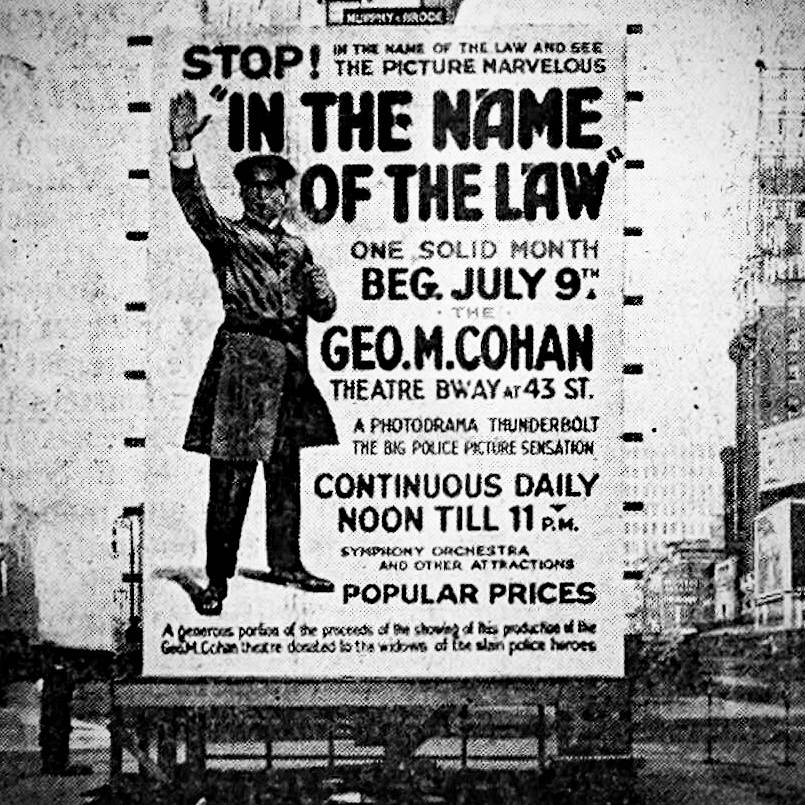

In the Name of the Law premiered in New York City on July 9, 1922. It was shown to movie patrons at the George M. Cohan Theater, converted to show movies. Instead of the standard booking for a week, they booked the film for a month. Film Booking Offices of America (FBO) claimed they extended the movie to a month, whereas "Variety" claimed it had booked a month in advance of the showing. FBO and the movie rags wrote about the sizable crowds viewing the movie. "Variety" magazine gave a less glowing but probably more realistic crowd-size report. This information is vital because future bookings always reference sell-out crowds in New York to prove its attraction power.

The New York premiere was the first example of the exploitation potential of the movie. New York had 12,000 police officers on the force at the time. Getting them involved in the advertising this movie proved to be a great success. Also, as part of an agreement to share some of the movie revenues with police causes, Emory Johnson presented each widow of seven police officers that had been killed in the line on duty individual checks for $170 (equivalent to $3,270 in 2025).

=== Official release ===
On July 6, 1922, the film was copyrighted to R-C (Robertson-Cole) Pictures Corp with registration number LP18034. The registered copyrights for FBO Films were with their original British owners. FBO was the official name of the film distributing operation for Robertson-Cole Pictures Corp. Joseph P. Kennedy Sr. would clear this up later The film was officially released for bookings on August 22, 1922.

=== Advertising ===
The film's producers, however, had a grander scheme to generate even more revenue. They implemented a promotional strategy that teamed city police departments with local theater owners to promote the film. Most police departments were knowingly on board with the exploitation aspect of the movie. Many local police departments gave the movie free advertising by staging stunts, regional police-in-action scenarios, appreciation parades, and other activities drawing attention to the local police force's work.

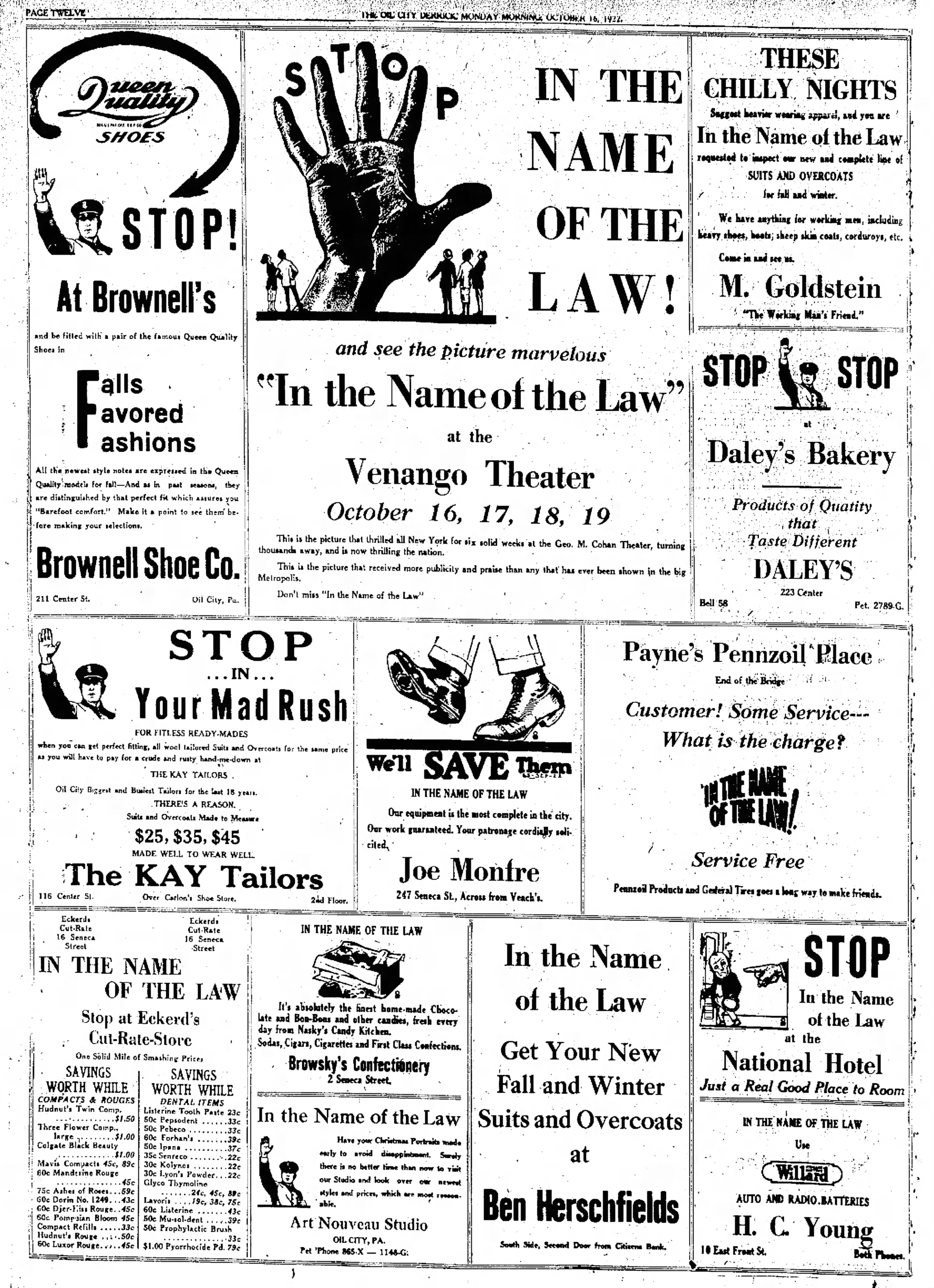

In many cases, even the local merchants jumped on the promotional bandwagon. The producers also encouraged local merchants to use the officer's graphic holding his hand up to sell their products.

A major part of this exploitation plan was to have movie booking agents get the local police department's cooperation and endorsement before showing the movie in their town. Before this film was released, FBO stated it had 100 letters from police chiefs around the country. The chiefs stated they would fully support the showing of this film in their cities. If the theater had questions about exploiting this movie, FBO would provide a 22-page newspaper-size campaign book.

Thus, this film had an organized and clear strategy for exploitation. Though the word exploitation has a nefarious overtone, it was thought to be mutually self-serving in this case. The police hoped the film would increase their image from bad-tempered dour automatons to ordinary family men but committed to maintaining the Law. This movie also gave police a chance to show off what they did and the services they provided. Often, these police demonstrations were filmed and shown as a prologue to the movie.

There was another critical piece of the exploitation pie. The New York exploitation included donating a percentage of the movie proceeds to police pension funds, police orphans, police widows, and other police causes. Lastly, as seen in the full-page newspaper ad, the local merchants often took advantage of promoting their products.

=== Reviews ===
Movie reviews were essential perspectives for theater owners and fans. Reviews of movies printed in various trade magazines were indispensable in deciding whether to book or watch the film. When critics had contrasting reviews, choosing whether to see or book the movie can be challenging, especially since discordant reviews do not mean it is necessarily a bad movie. Ultimately, it boiled down to personal choices and how much value you place on the movie review and the reviewer. Movie critics' evaluations of this film were mixed. Most small-town venues embraced the movie, while the story or sentimentality did not take in larger cities.

Melodrama films have plots appealing to the raised passions of the audience. They concentrate on family issues, direct their attention to a victim's character, and develop the themes of duty and love. The melodramatic format shows the characters working through their struggles with persistence, sacrificial deeds, and courage. Movie critics and theater owners often use the following expressions to describe the movies they are reviewing or showing.
Terms used in reviewing silent movie melodrama

==== Critical response ====
- In the July 22, 1922, issue of the Moving Picture World, Mary Kelly states:
  "At least one feature about the production is strikingly different. Burlesque is absent, which has long been considered indispensable in connection with the American policeman's screen. Here is a sincere human treatment of the side of the life of which the public usually hears nothing. This should mean very definite success for the picture with the brass-buttoned tribe, as well as the not inconsiderable number of those who have always been in close sympathy with the policeman and his troubles.
  Picture of family's life with strong dramatic touches should have broad appeal."
- In the July 22, 1922, issue of the Motion Picture News, Laurence Reid observes:
  "They have tacked a magnetic, seat-selling title to this picture. With proper exploitation certain to be given by those exhibitors who believe in advertising, there is no reason FBO would feel worried over the returns. The only fault which we found with it is the rather arbitrary leaning of the director in shaping a melodramatic finish - a result that reveals the characters as not over-blessed with imagination."
- In the July 29, 1922, issue of the Exhibitors Herald, the reviewer points out:
  "This is a real old fashioned melodramatic picture, full of thrills, home life stuff, mother love, and exploitation angles sufficient to permit of its being put over in a big way. Lovers of thrills as dealt out in rapid-fire melodramatic picturization of home life stories, will find plenty to satisfy them."

==== Audience response ====
FBO focused on producing and distributing films for small-town venues. They served this market melodramas, non-Western action pictures, and comedic shorts. Unlike major Hollywood studios, FBO owned no movie theaters and depended on movie house proprietors renting their films. Like most independents, FBO depended on the movie house owners to renting their films to show a profit.

Before leasing a film, picture house owners were concerned that the film is a potential moneymaker in their locale. Proprietors would subscribe to trade journals to assist them in making these financial judgments. Movie magazines would show the film's branding, critical reviews and publish other managers' viewpoints, including attendance numbers and revenue. These are brief published observations from movie house owners.

- JE Hughes, Rialto Theatre Alliance, Nebraska, population 4,591
  "It sure packed them in. Good three days' business at ten and 30 cents. A nice story all the way through. The first two reels drag a little. Comments all good." – General patronage
- Hess & Rau, Metropolitan Theatre Watertown, South Dakota, population 9,400
  "A big cleanup, proved one of the money makers of the season. Pleased all classes and has his much interest mingled with heart-digging pathos has "over the hill" and "the old nest". Use extended exploitation, such as cutouts, walking 24 sheets, and increased newspaper space. Tied up with the police department. Interested civic organizations – as a result, play to increase business. If you were looking for an honest-to-goodness cleanup together with a real picture book this." – General patronage
- William Noble, Criterion theatre Oklahoma City, Oklahoma, population 91,295
  "One of the greatest and best pictures ever shown in Oklahoma City. Please big business. Exploitation was extensive with newspaper advertising, billboards, window cards, and a very attractive lobby. The entire police force of Oklahoma City were invited as guests and all became big boosters for the picture. Daily press very complementary with their criticism." – General patronage
- TW Lancaster, Grande theatre Detroit, Michigan, population 993,678
  "I paid way above the average rental on this picture, but the cost is nothing when you have something you are not ashamed to get behind and boost, and at the end of a run, you have something to show for your efforts. This picture proved one of my biggest money-getters." – Neighborhood patronage

== Film labels ==
Since the film is lost, it has been labeled as a police drama, sports film, and police drama featuring baseball legend Honus Wagner. Even today, various online platforms refer to In the Name of the Law, as a film featuring Honus Wagner catching baseballs thrown from a building roof.
Since the publication of this page, many movie databases have adjusted the description and corrected this error.

== Honus Wagner connection ==
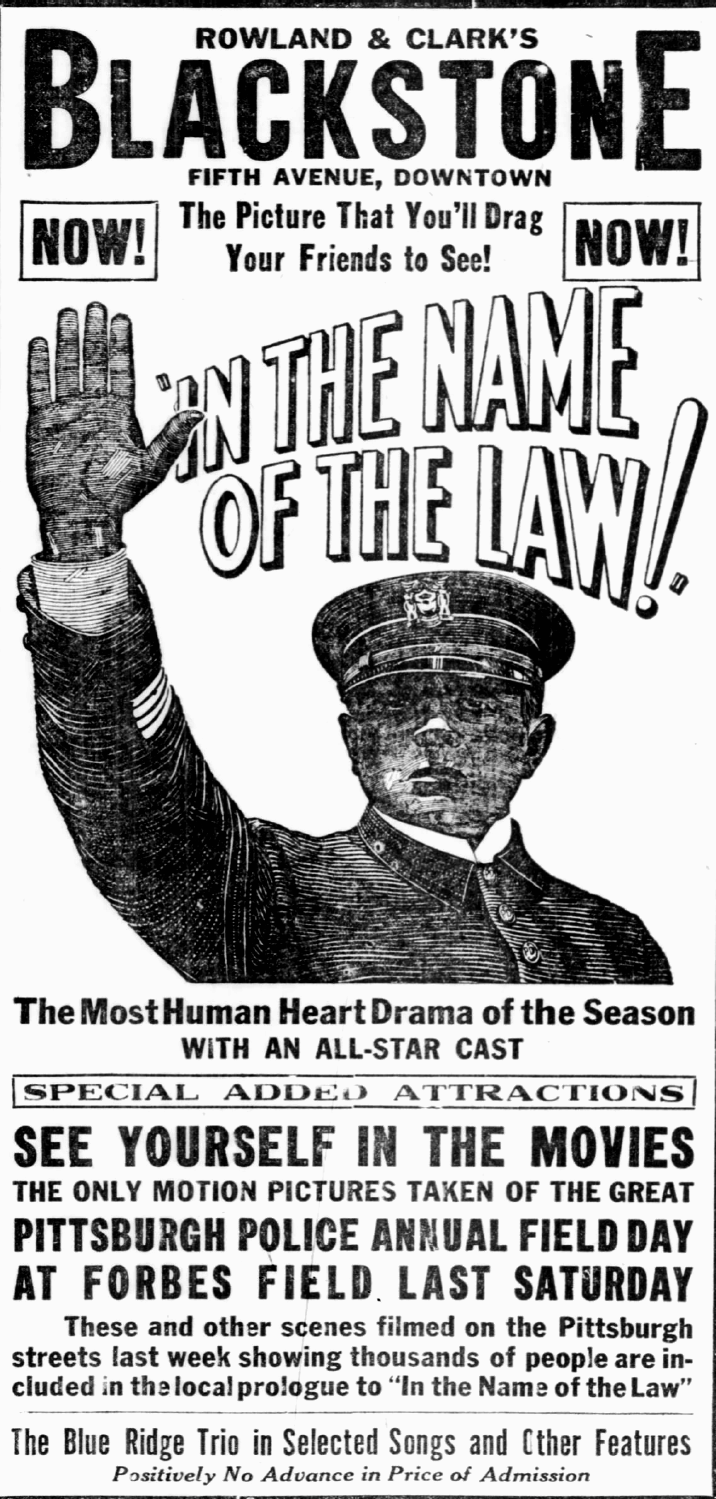

Several websites claim Honus Wagner had a role in this film. Pittsburgh Pirates retired baseball superstar Honus Wagner did not take part in the writing, production, or direction, nor did he have any major or minor roles in the film's production. The confusion occurred when Honus Wagner participated in the movie exploitation campaign staged in Pittsburgh, Pennsylvania. The campaign aimed to get the local police departments involved in promoting this police film. Thus, Wagner did assist in promoting this film along with the Pittsburgh Police Department.

Many police departments participated in promoting this film when it landed in their jurisdictions. As stated above, the movie first premiered in New York and became the first practice run at exploiting this movie. This first exploitation included the participation of two New York baseball superstars. This promotion has a direct tie-in to the Honus Wagner stunt. The following is a quote from an article published in the July issue of the "Moving Picture World":

The attention of all Broadway was focused on the picture during the noon hour on Monday, July 17th, when "Babe" Ruth and Bob Meusel performed a ball-throwing act in the center of Times Square, to aid the run of the picture, a part of the receipts of which will be given to police widows and orphans.

This film was released in August 1922, and Pittsburgh scheduled its first showing in September. FBO coordinated with the Pittsburgh police department to promote the film and launched an exploitation campaign. The promotion started on Monday, September 11, 1922. "Hollywood cameramen" filmed the Superintendent of Police, his staff, and other policemen in action. Shown below is the schedule for the Pittsburgh promotion.

Pittsburgh Daily Post published schedule of events
| Date | Event |
|---|---|
| Mon Sep 11, 1922 | At noon, cameramen will film backgrounds for the opening scenes. The starting location will be at Fifth Avenue and Liberty, ending at Fifth Avenue and Wood Street. The public is invited to view all the action. |
| Tue Sep 12, 1922 | At noon, cameramen will capture the activities centered at Liberty Avenue and Wood Street. |
| Wed Sep 13, 1922 | Further scenes will be photographed at Liberty Avenue and Tenth Street. |
| Thu Sep 14, 1922 | The vicinity of the Fifth Avenue High School will be the scene of action at noon Thursday. Currently, the site is the location of the Fifth Avenues Lofts. |
| Fri Sep 15, 1922 | Former Pittsburgh Pirates great Honus Wagner will be the center of interest on Friday. At noon, Pittsburgh Police Superintendent John C. Calhoun will drop baseballs from the top of the 144-foot City-County building to a waiting Honus Wagner below. (Hans' was able to snare the first and third pitches.) Motion pictures of this event, along with pictures of the crowd, will be taken simultaneously. Later in the day, they will stage a thrilling chase scene in Schenley Park. Two motorcycle police will pursue a stolen vehicle, eventually capturing and arresting the driver. |
| Sat Sep 16, 1922 | Forbes Field is the gathering place for the greater Pittsburgh Annual Police Department field day featuring the New Keyon Orchestra with John Marsh conducting. |
| Sun Sep 17, 1922 | Superintendent Calhoun, along with county officials and a newspaperman, will be the guests of James B. Clark at the special screening of In the Name of the Law. The feature film will be shown along with a prologue of local pictures shot earlier in the week. |
| Mon Sep 18, 1922 | In the Name of the Law starts showing at Rowland & Clark's Blackstone Theater located on Fifth Avenue in downtown Pittsburgh, PA. |

Thus, on a September afternoon in 1922, a retired baseball superstar caught baseballs tossed from a city building roof. This attraction, along with "thousands" of spectators watching the event, was captured on film, photographed by local newspapers, and shown as a prologue to this attraction. Somehow, Honus Wagner's stunt became inextricably intertwined with this movie.

Displayed below are three newspaper clippings from the Pittsburgh event.

Newspaper clippings from Pittsburgh
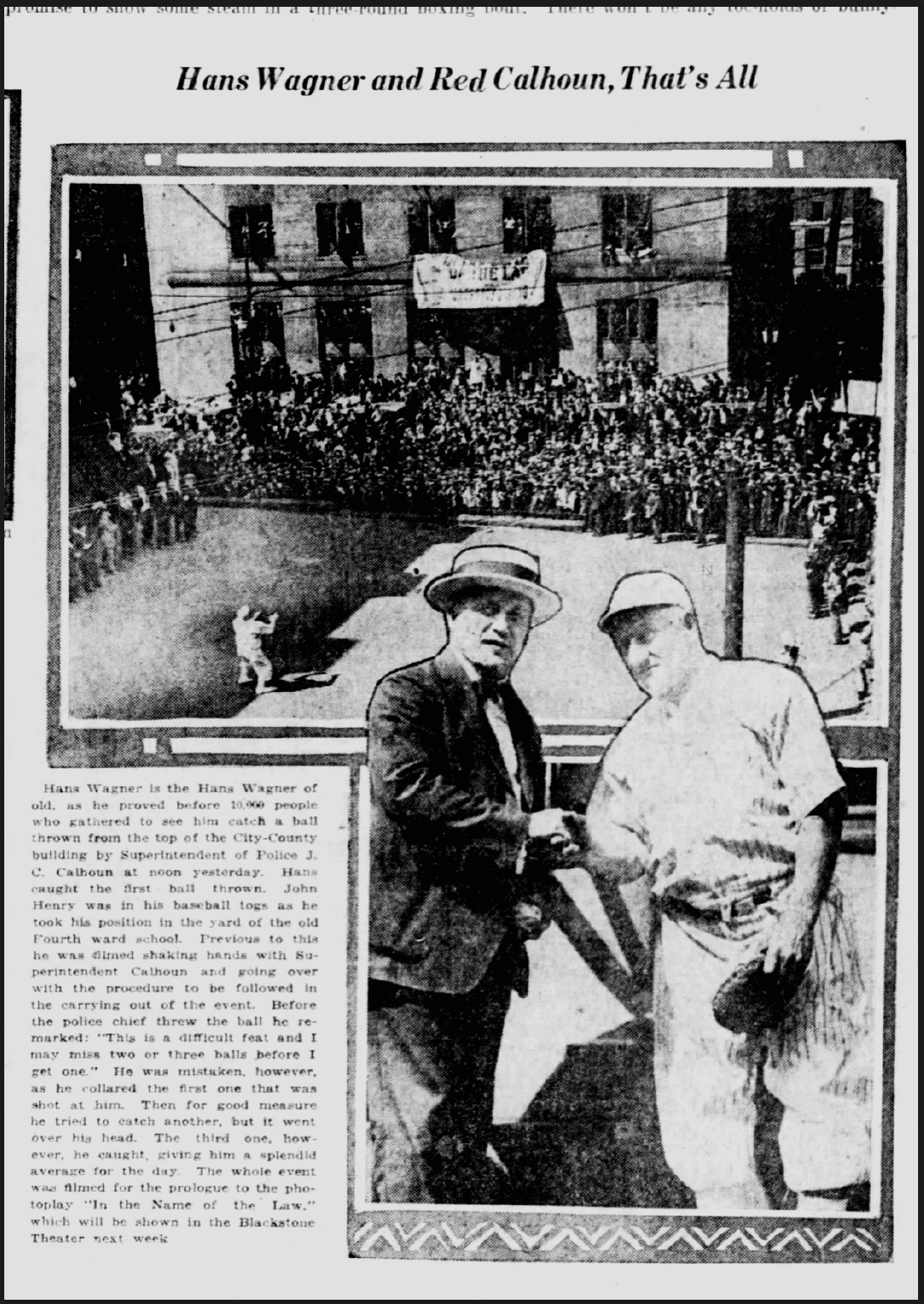
Police Superintendent John (Red) Calhoun shaking hands with Honus Wagner

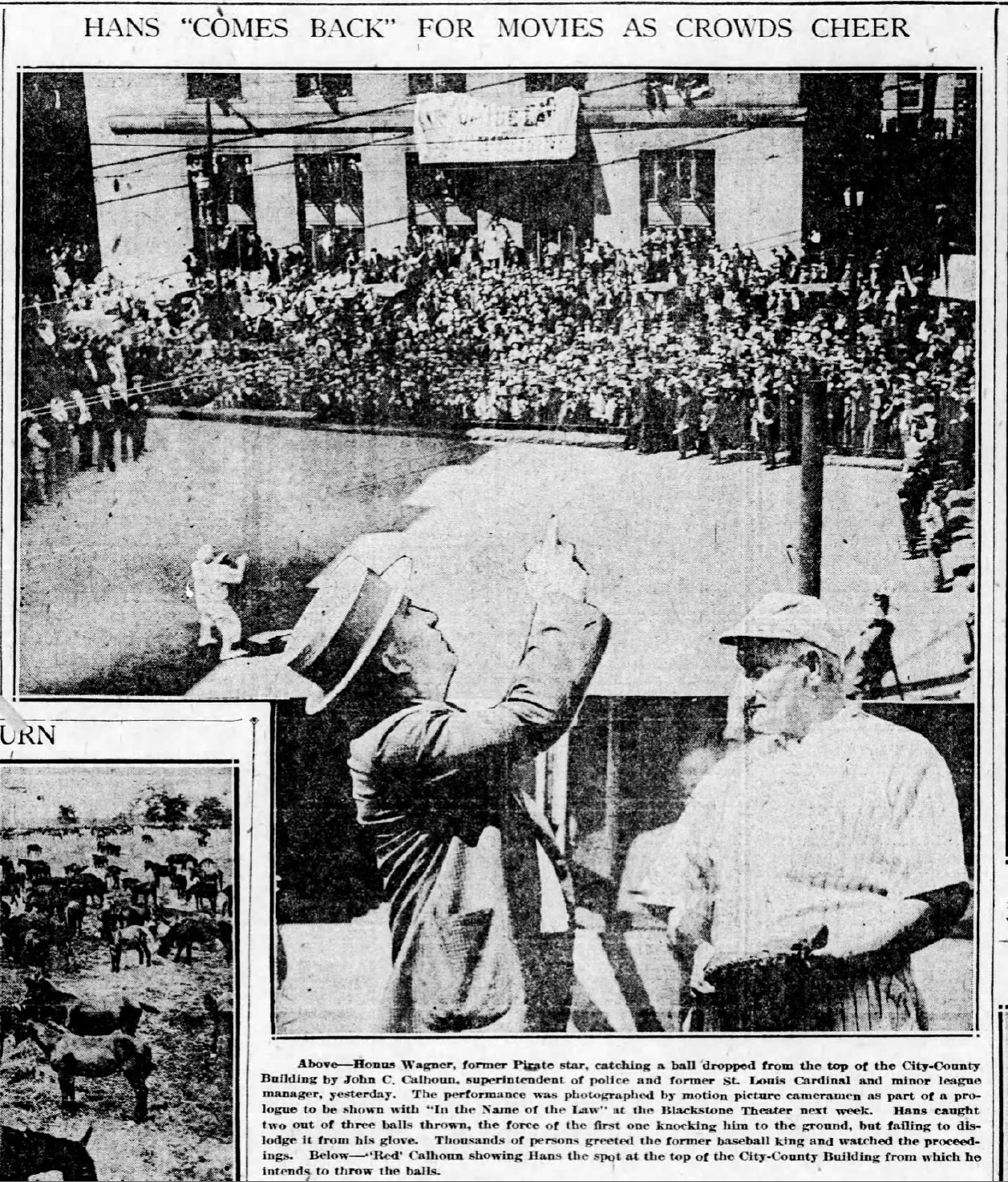
Police Superintendent Calhoun pointing to the rooftop where he will throw baseballs to Honus Wagner

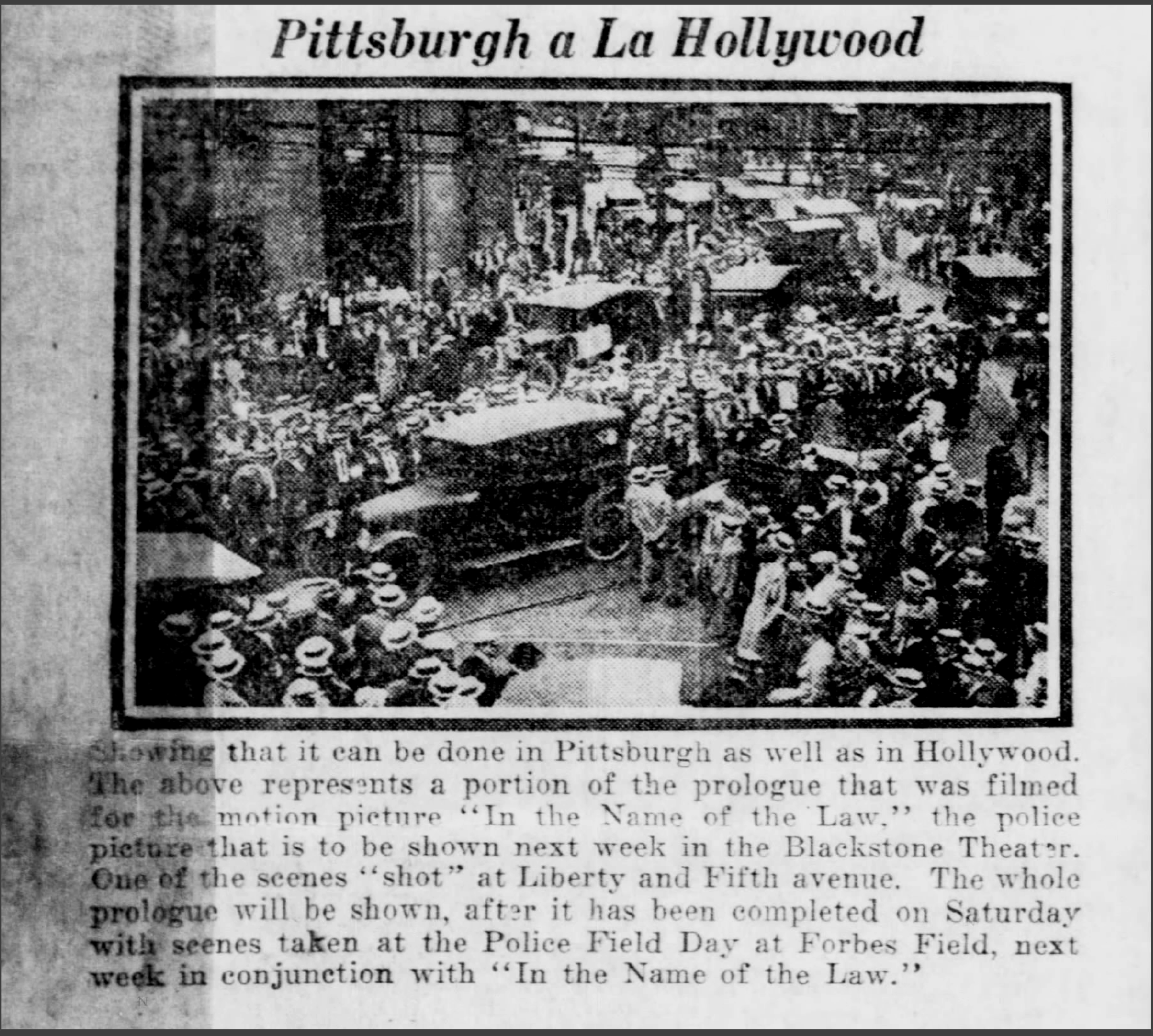
Pittsburgh comparing local scenes to scenes filmed in Hollywood

== Preservation status ==
The majority of silent films did not survive. (Note: With every foot of film that is lost, we lose a link to our culture, to the world around us, to each other, and ourselves – Martin Scorsese, filmmaker A report by Library of Congress film historian and archivist David Pierce estimates that: around 75% of original silent-era films have perished; 14% of the 10,919 silent films released by major studios exist in their original 35 mm or other formats; 11% survive only in full-length foreign versions or film formats of lesser image quality.; Many silent-era films did not survive for reasons as explained on this Wikipedia page.)
According to the Library of Congress website, this film has a status of "No holdings located in archives"; thus, it is presumed all copies of this film are lost. (Note: Copy of the Library of Congress copyright Title: In The Name Of The Law [motion picture] Director: Johnson, Emory Dates Issued: 6/7/1922 Physical Description: 7 reels; 6,126 ft. Star: Cast--Prolog: Ben Alexander (Harry O'hara, 9) Copyright Claimant: Emory Johnson Productions Registration number: Lp18034 Studio: R-C/FBO Holdings: No holdings located in archives.)

== Gallery ==
=== Principal Players and Director ===
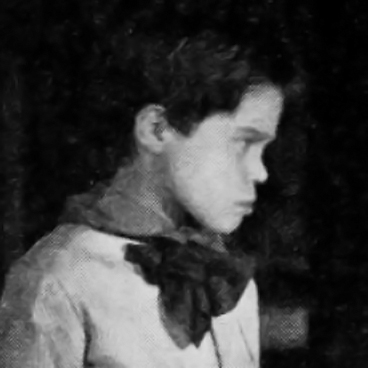
Johnny Thompson
Young Johnnie

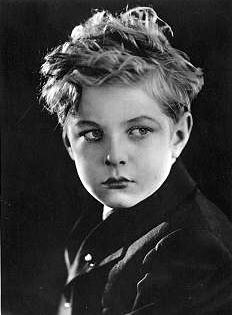
Ben Alexander
Young Harry

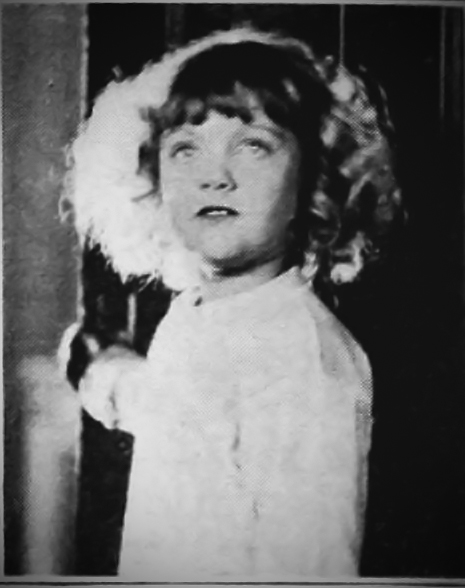
Josephine Adair
Young Mary

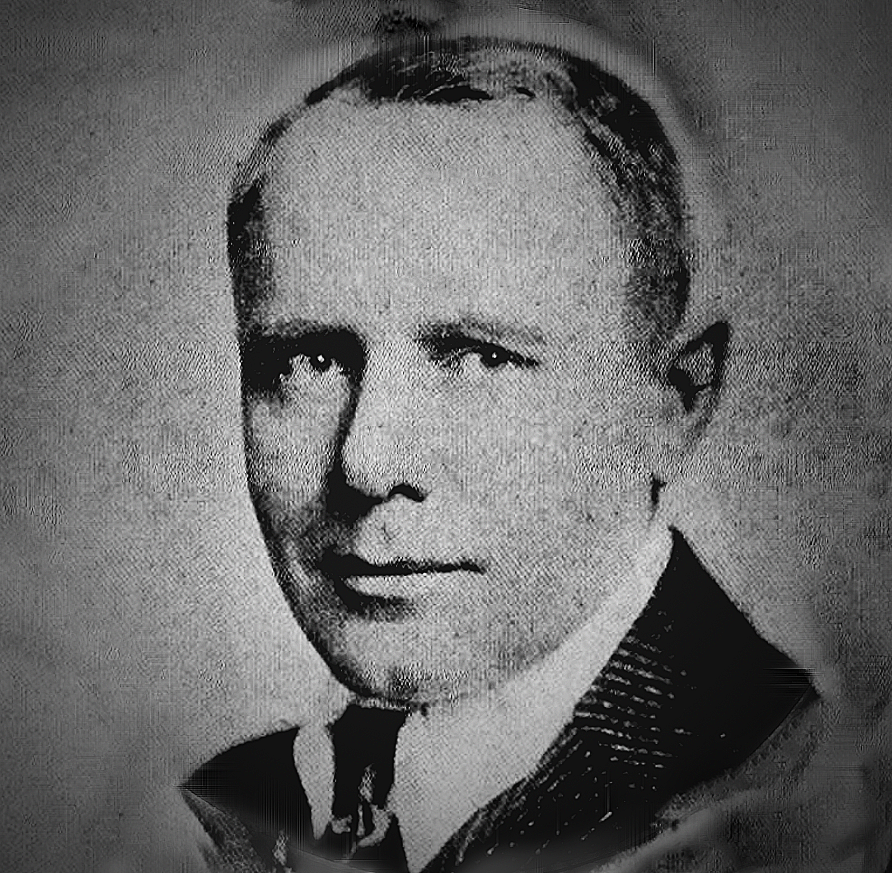
Ralph Lewis
Patrick O'Hara

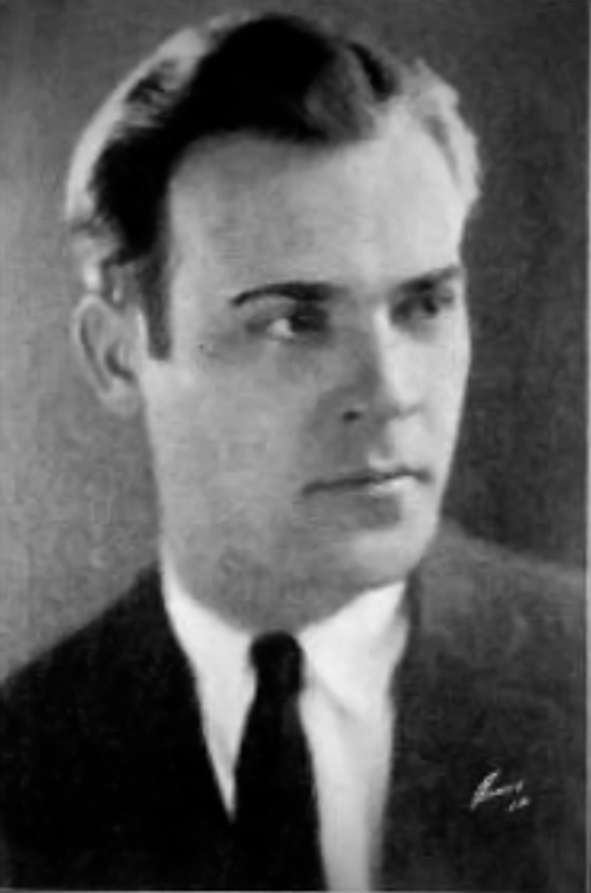
Johnnie Walker
Johnnie O'Hara

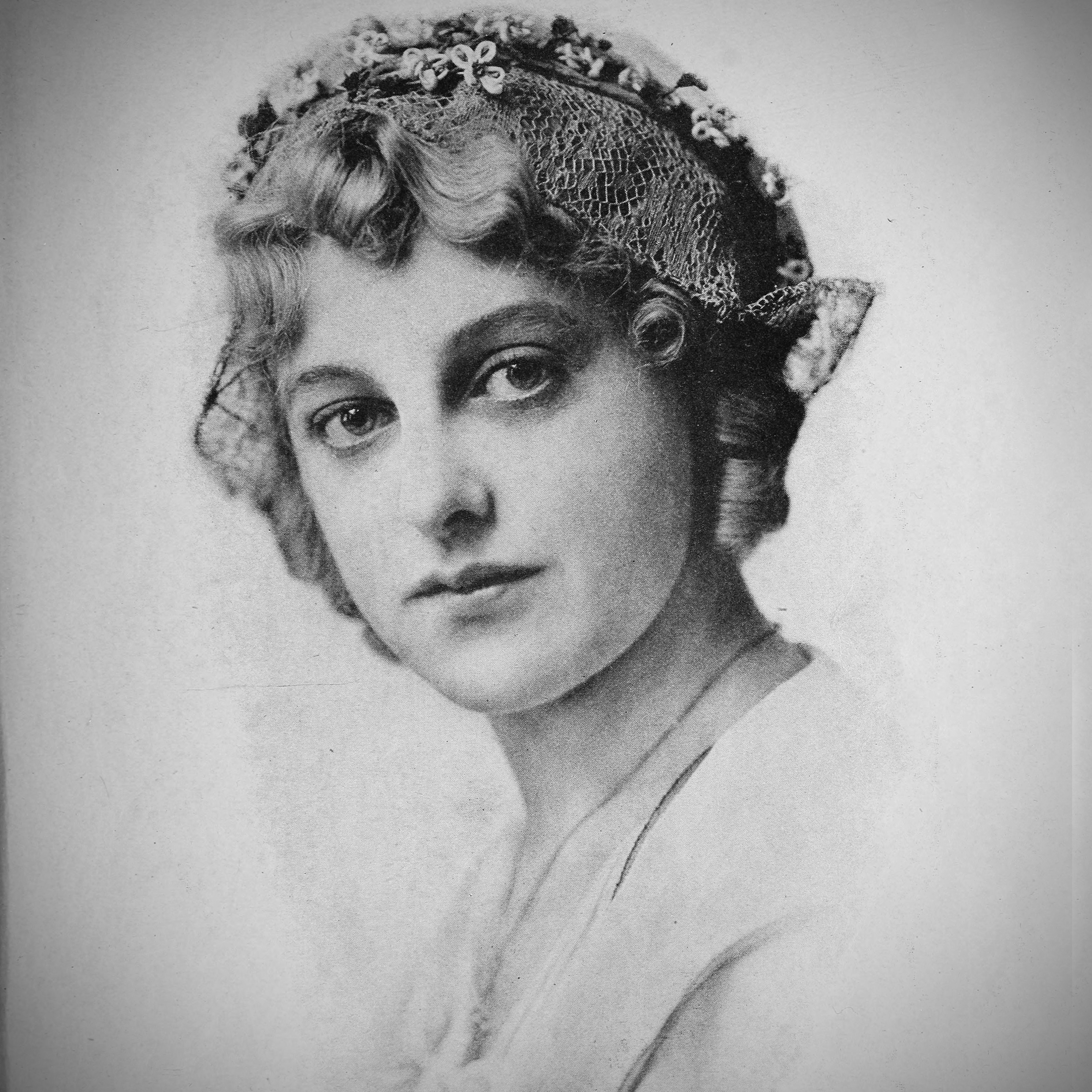
Ella Hall
Mary

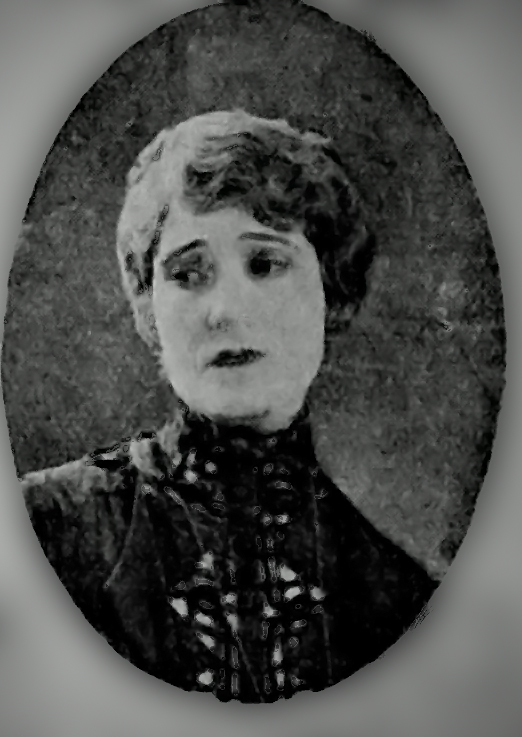
Claire McDowell
Mrs. O'Hara

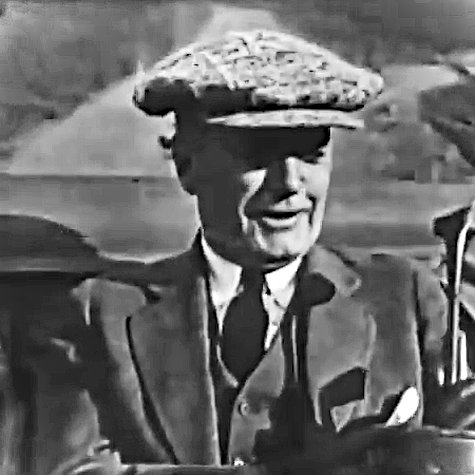
Richard Morris
Mr. Lucus

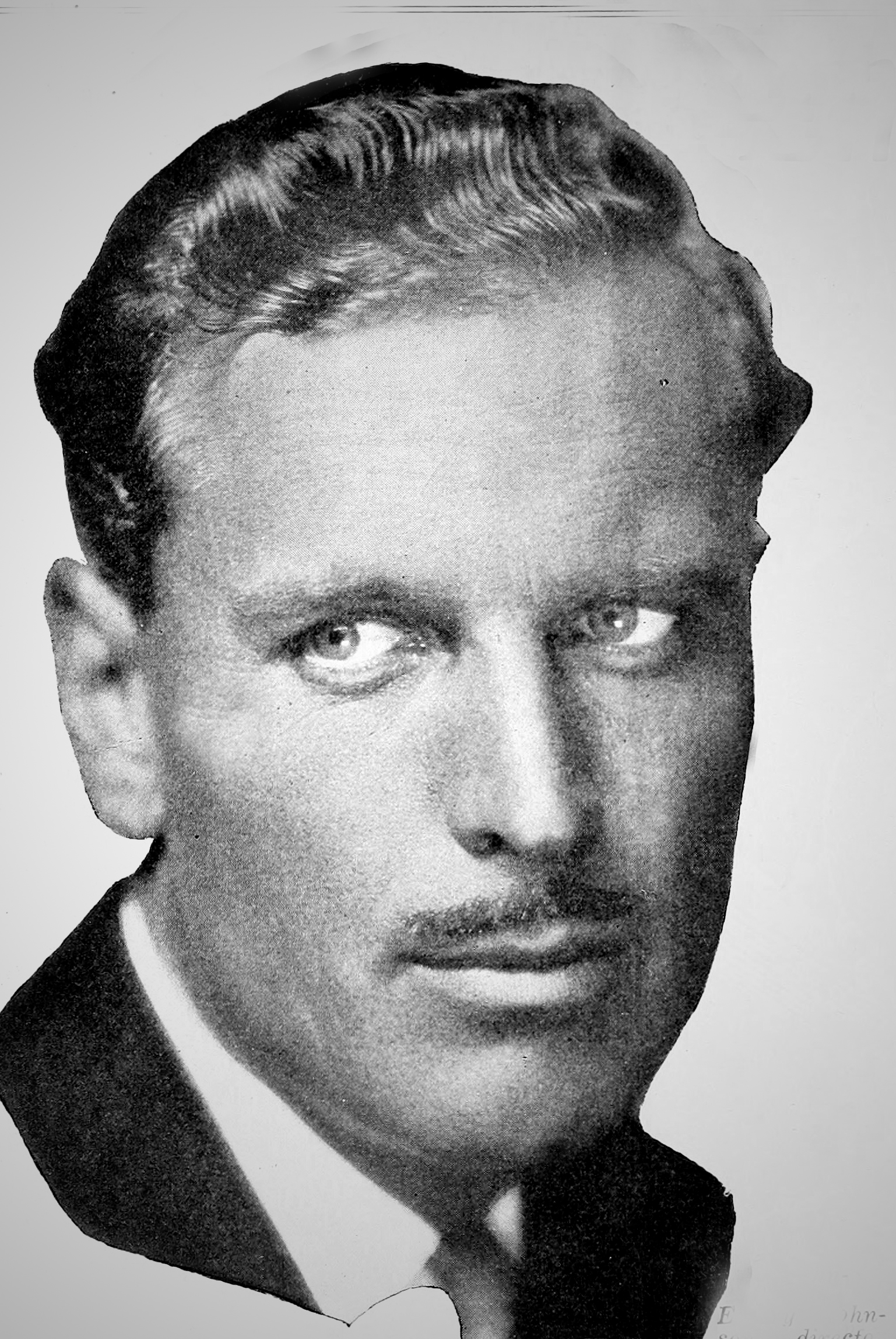
Emory Johnson
Harry O'Hara
Director

== Bibliography ==
- Fleming, E.J. (2013). Wallace Reid: The Life and Death of a Hollywood Idol. McFarland. ISBN 978-0-7864-8266-5.
- Kitchmer, George A. (2002). A Biographical Dictionary of Silent Film Western Actors and Actresses. Jefferson, North Carolina: McFarland & Company, Inc. ISBN 978-0-7864-4693-3.
- Lasky, Betty (1984). RKO The Biggest Little Major of Them All. Englewood Cliffs, NJ: Prentice-Hall. p. 14. ISBN 0-13-781451-8.
- Slide, Anthony (2000). Nitrate Won't Wait: History of Film Preservation in the United States. McFarland. p. 5. ISBN 978-0786408368. "It is often claimed that 75 percent of all American silent films are gone and 50 percent of all films made prior to 1950 are lost, but such figures, as archivists admit in private, were thought up on the spur of the moment, without statistical information to back them up."

== American Film Institute cast links ==
- Ben Alexander
- Johnny Thompson
- Josephine Adair
- Ralph Lewis
- Clair McDowell
- Emory Johnson
- Johnny Walker
- Ella Hall
- Richard Morris
- Emilie Johnson
