= Camera! =

American film industry trade paper (1918–1924)

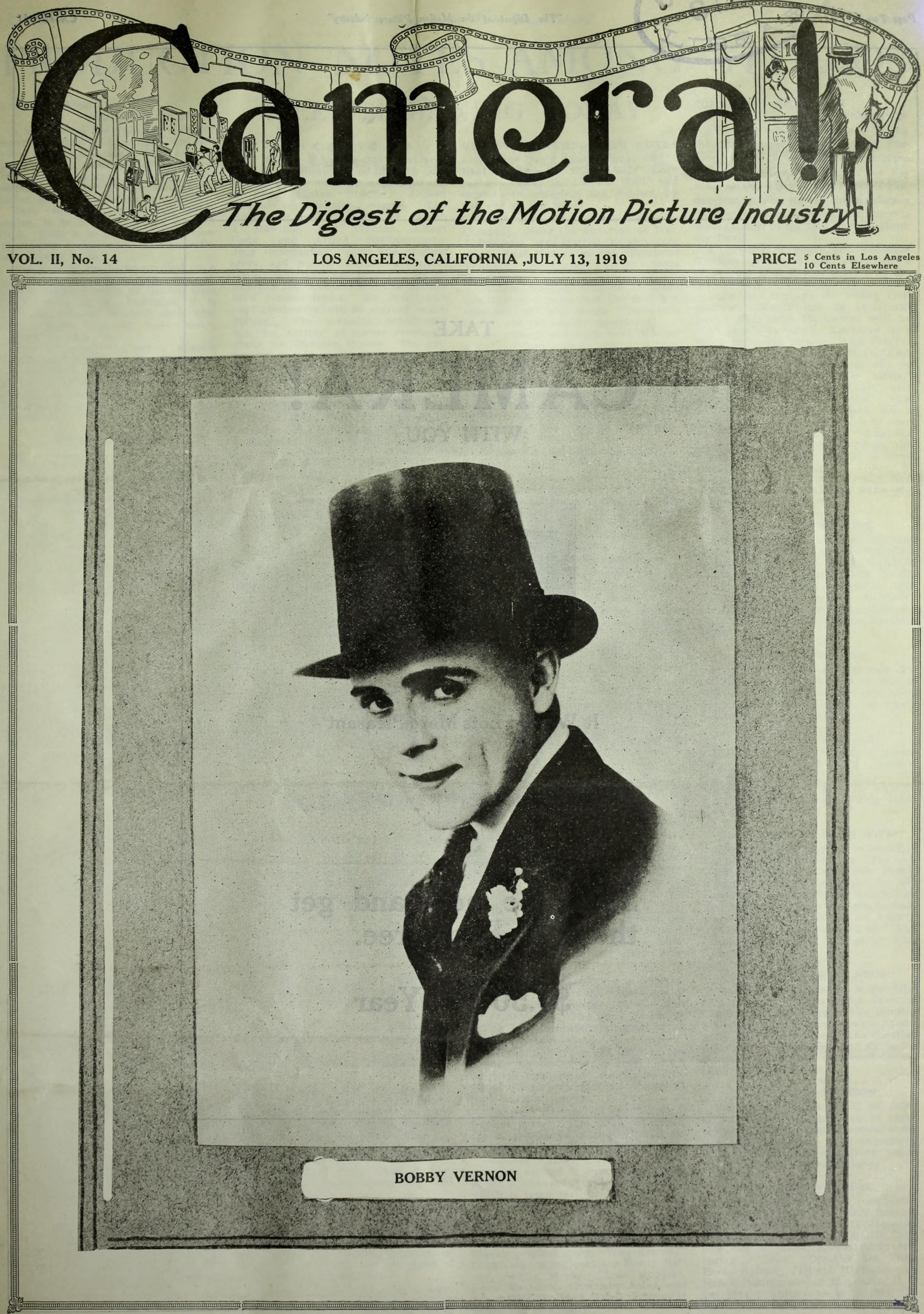
Bobby Vernon on the cover of Camera! (July 1919)

Camera! The Digest of the Motion Picture Industry was an American film industry trade paper from 1918 to 1924. Camera! is notable as "the film industry’s first weekly trade paper to consistently publish from Los Angeles." The publication also took strong stances against "what it perceived as detrimental forces in the industry, notably, the rampant 'fake' schools of acting, and the newly formed Motion Picture Producers and Distributors of America and its first president Will Hays."

Unlike some entertainment industry periodicals of the day, Camera! only covered cinema, not legitimate theater or vaudeville. The Camera! offices were adjacent to the Photoplayers' Equity Association.
