= Youth and the Bright Medusa =

- First edition book cover
- Author: Willa Cather
- Language: English
- Genre: Short story collection
- Publisher: Alfred A. Knopf
- Publication date: 1920
- Publication place: United States
- Media type: Print

Youth and the Bright Medusa is a collection of short stories by Willa Cather, published in 1920. Several were published in an earlier collection, The Troll Garden.

== Contents ==
This collection contains the following stories:

- "Coming, Aphrodite!" a.k.a. "Coming, Eden Bower!"
- "The Diamond Mine"
- "A Gold Slipper"
- "Scandal"
- "Paul's Case"
- "A Wagner Matinee"
- "The Sculptor's Funeral"
- "A Death in the Desert"

== Publication ==
The book was the first book Cather published with Alfred A. Knopf. She was unhappy with her publisher Houghton Mifflin and had been interested in Knopf since seeing their edition of Green Mansions by William Henry Hudson. Cather liked the looks of their books and how they supported their authors with well-designed advertisements. Cather was still under contract with Houghton Mifflin for her novels so Knopf offered to put out a selection of her short stories.
