= Way of the World =

Way of the World or The Way of the World may refer to:

== Music ==
- "Way of the World" (Cheap Trick song), 1979
- "Way of the World" (Max Q song), 1989
- "Way of the World", a song by Flipper from the album Album – Generic Flipper
- "Way of the World" (Tina Turner song), 1991
- "Way of the World", a song by Genesis from We Can't Dance, 1991
- The Way of the World (EP), a 2026 EP by Tina Arena
- The Way of the World (album), a 2010 album by Mose Allison
- "The Way of the World", a 1973 song by Roger Daltrey from Daltrey

== Film ==
- Way of the World (film), a 1910 American short drama film directed by D. W. Griffith
- The Way of the World (1916 film), an American film directed by Lloyd B. Carleton
- The Way of the World (1920 film), a British silent drama film

== Literature ==
=== Fiction ===
- The Way of the World, a 1700 play by William Congreve
- The Way of the World, an 1831 novel by Elizabeth Caroline Grey
- The Way of the World, an 1867 novel by Oliver Optic
- "The Way of the World", a translation of "Verden lønner ikke anderledes" (1871), one of the Norwegian Folktales.
- The Way of the World, an 1883 novel by David Christie Murray
- "The Way of the World" (short story), an 1898 story by Willa Cather
- The Way of the World and Other Ways, a 1900 novel by Katherine Eleanor Conway
- The Way of the World, a 2003 novel by Elizabeth Aston
- The Way of the World (book), a 2008 book by Ron Suskind

=== Non-fiction ===
- The Way of the World, a 2007 translation of the travel memoir by Nicolas Bouvier, originally published in French in 1963, under the title L'Usage du monde (1929–1998)
- "Way of the World", a column in the British Daily Telegraph originated by Colin Welch in 1955 but most famously associated with Michael Wharton from 1957; later written by Christopher Booker, Auberon Waugh and Craig Brown

== Other ==
- Way of the World, a 1954–1955 U.S. network weekday TV program

== See also ==
- That's the Way of the World (disambiguation)
