= The Troll Garden =

1905 short story collection by Willa Cather

- First edition book cover
- Author: Willa Cather
- Language: English
- Genre: Short story collection
- Publisher: McClure, Phillips & Co
- Publication date: 1905
- Publication place: United States
- Media type: Print
- Text: The Troll Garden at Wikisource

The Troll Garden is a collection of short stories by Willa Cather, published in 1905.

== Contents ==
This collection contains the following seven stories:

- "Flavia and Her Artists"
- "The Sculptor's Funeral"
- "A Death in the Desert"
- "The Garden Lodge"
- "The Marriage of Phaedra"
- "A Wagner Matinee"
- "Paul's Case"

Four of these stories--"The Sculptor's Funeral," "A Death in the Desert," "A Wagner Matinee," and "Paul's Case"—were revised and included in Cather's next collection of short fiction Youth and the Bright Medusa, published in 1920.
