= Diamond Mine =

A diamond mine is a site where diamonds are extracted.

Diamond Mine may refer to:

== Music ==
- Diamond Mine (Blue Rodeo album), 1989
- Diamond Mine (King Creosote and Jon Hopkins album), 2011
- The Diamond Mine, a 2005 mixtape by Diamond D

== Other uses ==
- "The Diamond Mine", a short story by Willa Cather
- Diamond Mine (professional wrestling), a professional wrestling stable
- "Diamond Mine" (Ice Road Truckers), a 2007 television episode
- Diamond Mine (video game), a 1980s home computer game
- Diamond Mine, a 2000 game from PopCap Games, later renamed Bejeweled
