= The Way of the World (1916 film) =

1916 film by Lloyd B. Carleton

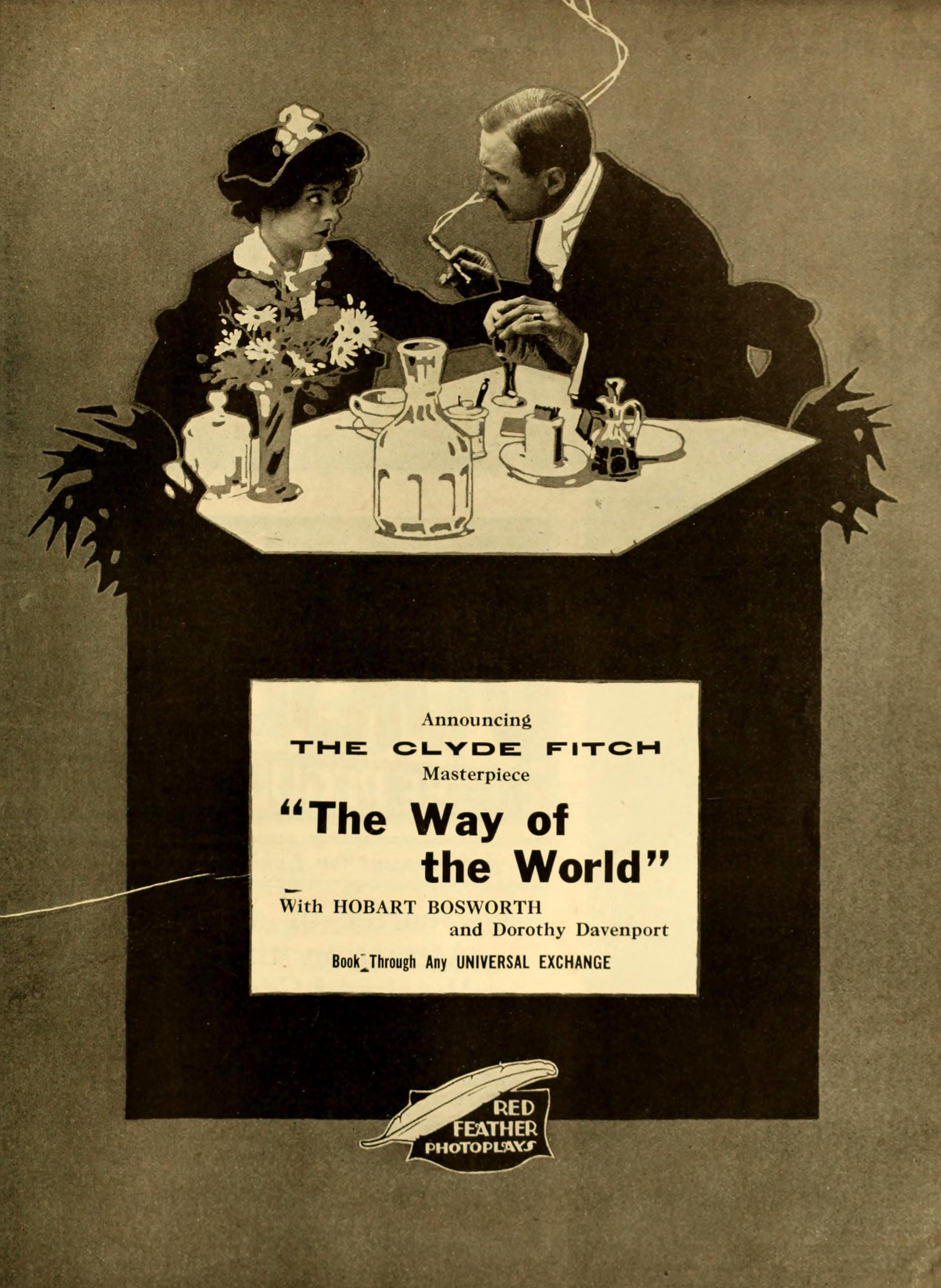
- The Moving Picture World Ad
- Directed by: Lloyd B. Carleton
- Written by: Clyde Fitch
- Screenplay by: F. McGrew Willis
- Produced by: Lloyd B. Carleton
- Starring: Hobart Bosworth; Dorothy Davenport; Emory Johnson
- Cinematography: Roy H. Klaffki
- Production company: Universal
- Distributed by: Universal
- Release date: July 3, 1916
- Running time: 50 – 75 minutes 5 reels
- Country: United States
- Language: (English intertitles)

The Way of the World is a 1916 American silent Feature film. The film was directed by Lloyd B. Carleton, while F. McGrew Willis adapted the screenplay from Clyde Fitch's play. The cast of this drama includes Hobart Bosworth, Dorothy Davenport, and Emory Johnson.

The plot revolves around Beatrice Farley, who scandalizes her marriage to first-term Governor Walter Croyden by engaging in a harmless flirtation with an old acquaintance, John Nevill, who had learn that Beatrice was the wife of the Governor try to snatched her in a twist. The scandal almost costs her husband a second term in office and leads to the death of Nevill.

Universal released the film on July 3, 1916.

== Plot ==
Peter Sturton is a politician and the head of the state political machine. Sturton supports Walter Croydon, a rising young attorney, for the position of Governor of the State. Croyden loves Beatrice Farley, a young society belle, but they have not been formally engaged. Croyden invites Beatrice to accompany him to a social ball. On the evening of the event, Croyden meets Sturton at his club and becomes intoxicated. While still intoxicated, he calls upon Beatrice. She refuses to go with him to the ball. The following day, Croyden returns to see Beatrice and apologizes for his condition of the previous evening. He asks Beatrice to forgive him, professes his love, and asks her to marry him. Beatrice tells Croyden she is making preparations to leave for Europe with Mr. and Mrs. Lake. She promises to give him an answer when she returns.

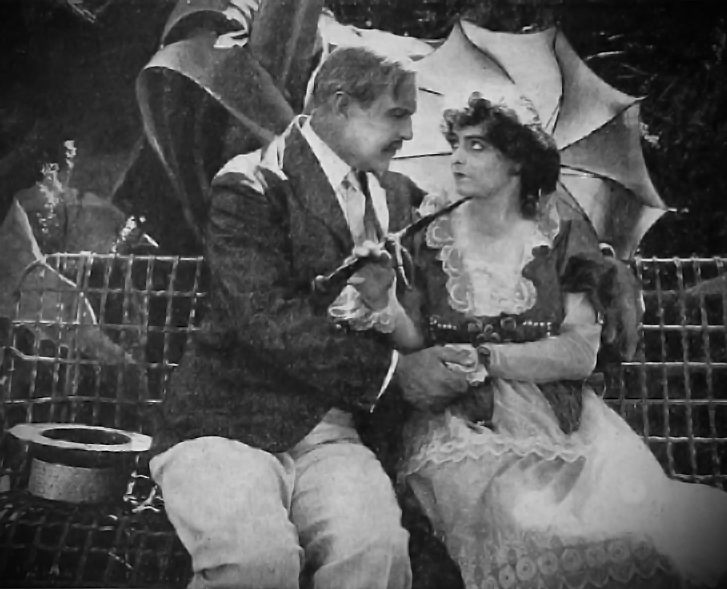
John Nevill is estranged from his wife, tries to woo the wife of another man.

John Nevill is a man about town and a friend of Sturton's. Nevill is part of an unhappy marriage, but he and his wife continue to live together. There is little love between them. Nevill makes plans to travel to trip Europe on his own. He tells his wife she can go wherever she wants for her vacation. As the boat is ready to sail, Nevill sees Beatrice bid Croydon goodbye and then board the ship. Beatrice's beauty overwhelms Nevill, and he quickly makes her acquaintance on the ship. He becomes infatuated with her. Nevill resolves to win her love and begins paying constant attention to her. He never reveals he's married. Beatrice and the Lakes come to Monte Carlo, where Nevill is staying, and Nevill, renewing the acquaintance, begins wooing her again.

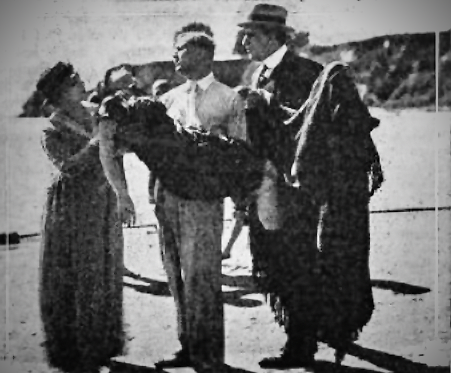
Nevill rescues Beatrice

While swimming, Beatrice has an accident, but Nevill comes to her rescue and saves her life. Beatrice discovers she loves him in return. Finally, Nevill proposes that they travel to Paris to get married, and Beatrice consents. When they return to the hotel to pack, they encounter friends of Nevill's who have arrived from America. Although Nevill had planned to tell Beatrice he was married, Nevill's friends casually mention his wife is staying in Newport for the Summer and sends her love. Beatrice's world suddenly collapses.

Beatrice is heartbroken and begins packing to return home. She has completely lost her faith in Nevill. Nevill pleads with her to no avail and finally, in a fit of anger, tells her he will not give up on her. He tells her in the future; he will make her love him again. After Beatrice departs, Nevill turns to drink. Word of his drinking reaches Mrs. Nevill, and she comes to him and persuades him to return home. In the meantime, they have elected Walter Croydon as Governor. Upon returning to the states, Beatrice consents to become Croydon's bride, and they marry. Sturton visits the Nevill's and asks them to attend the Governor's Inaugural ball. He tells the Nevill's it will allow them to meet the Governor and his wife. Nevill discovers the Governor's wife is Beatrice, and it awakens his passion. Nevill hatches a deceitful scheme to win Beatrice from Croydon. Beatrice feels the effects of her rejection on Nevill. After listening to Nevill's pleas for forgiveness, Beatrice agrees to be his friend. Nevill becomes a friend of the family. Although they are together often, Croydon suspects no improprieties, and Beatrice feels nothing improper in her friendship with Nevill. Nevill, in the subsequent years, poisons the mind of Croydon with thoughts that his wife is unfaithful.

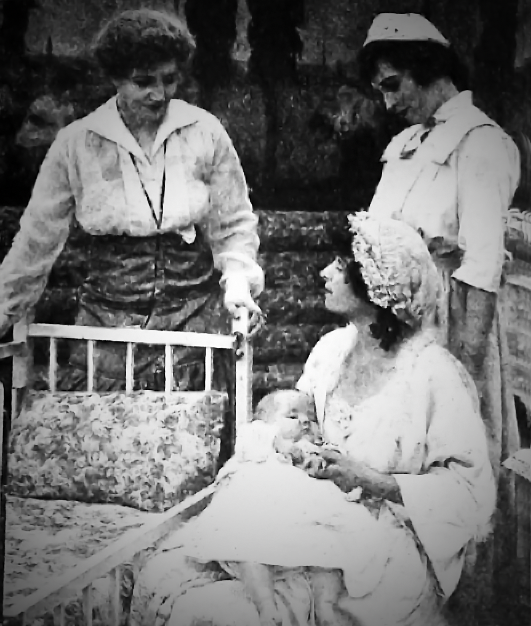
Beatrice is devoted to her baby son

Time passes, and Croyden is running for reelection. Sturton has had a falling out with the Governor and is opposing him with every weapon in his command. The Croydon's now have a child — a boy a few months old. Mr. Lake goes to Croyden and tells him that the people are talking about of frequency of Nevill being seen with Mrs. Croydon. The Governor dismisses this talk as nothing more than idle gossip.

Nevill, realizing he has planted the seeds of suspicion, now implements the last phase of his plan to convince Croyden to leave his wife. He gives Sturton a paragraph to put in the papers on the day before the election, saying while the Governor has been away securing votes, his wife has been continually in the company of a certain man whom the paper does not mention. After Croyden reads the article in the newspaper, he goes straight to Nevill. Nevill assures him he can trust his wife, and Croyden dismisses the matter.

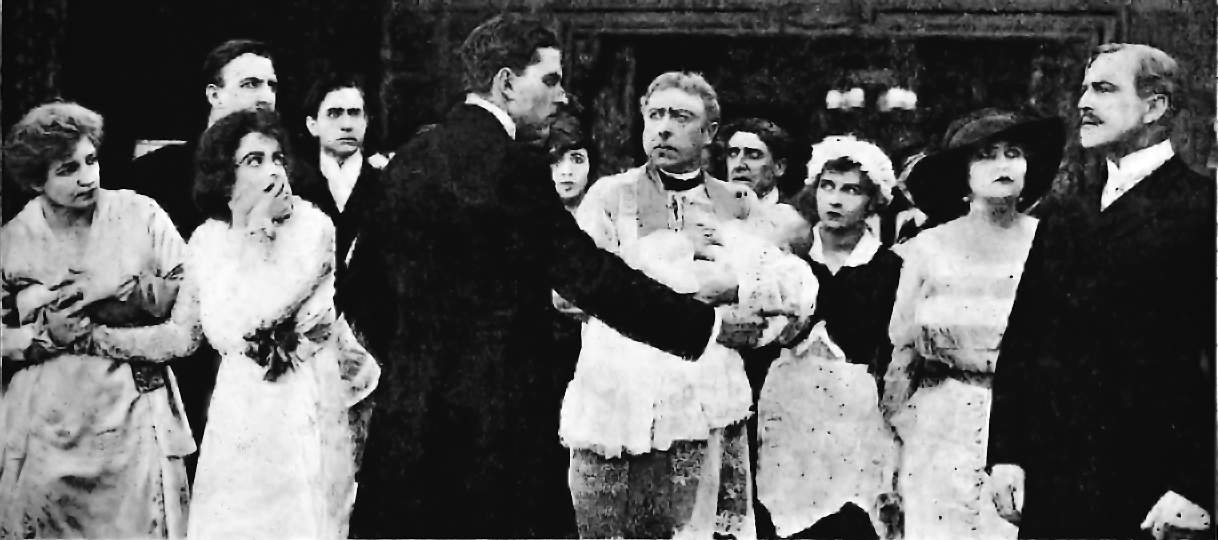
During the christening, the Governor accuses Nevill of being the father of his wife's child

The day has arrived, and Croydon's baby is about to be christened. The guests are gathering at the church, and Croydon prepares to leave his office. Before he steps out the door, he sees a copy of the newspaper article implying the child's father might not be Croydon but the man Beatrice spends so much of her time with. Overcome with grief, Croydon drinks heavily and then shows up in the middle of the christening. The intoxicated Croydon denounces Beatrice and forbids her to name the boy after him. Croydon then accuses Nevill, mano-a-mano, of being the father of the child. Nevill refuses to deny the charge. Croydon leaves the church, locks himself in his room, and refuses to see Beatrice or even let her explain. After the commotion at the church, Mr. and Mrs. Nevill return home. Mrs. Nevill, convinced of her husband's guilt, tells him she is giving up on this marriage. She declares Beatrice was the woman responsible for his melancholy in Europe. He tells her to go, for he believes Beatrice will come back begging for his forgiveness.

Beatrice is in shock at her husband's reactions. She realizes only Nevill can clear her name and goes to Nevill's home to appeal to him to prove her innocence. Beatrice tells Mrs. Lake where she is going. She arrives at Nevill's house, finding him alone. Nevill believes he has won her back. He insists he'll write a letter clearing her name, but she must pay the price — she must be his, if for no longer than an hour. He writes the letter, then latches the door and confronts her. Beatrice struggles fiercely to preserve her honor and finally, in desperation, grabs a sharp paper-knife and stabs him. She drops the knife to the floor. Croyden has determined where Beatrice has gone and, accompanied by Mrs. Nevill, heads for the Neville House. After arriving at the Nevill estate, Croyden breaks down the door and finds Nevill dying on the floor. Realizing that he is on the verge of death, Nevill reconsiders. He picks up the knife with a trembling hand and tells them for Beatrice's love, and because she has repulsed him, he has attempted suicide. He takes the note clearing Beatrice's name from his pocket and gives it to Croyden. Croyden realizes that this will absolve him in the people's eyes and tip the election in his favor. Nevill begs Beatrice's forgiveness, then collapses, falls weakly back on the floor, and dies. He paid the price of his obsession. It is the "Way of the World."

== Cast ==
Actor	Role
Hobart Bosworth	Mr. John Nevill
Gretchen Lederer	Mrs. John Nevill
Dorothy Davenport	Beatrice Farley (Mrs. Croyden)
Emory Johnson	Walter Croyden
Adele Farrington	Mrs. Lake
C. Norman Hammond	Mr. Lake
Jack Curtis	Peter Sturton
Herbert Barrington	Mr. Van Norman
Marc Fenton	The priest

== Production ==
=== Pre-production ===
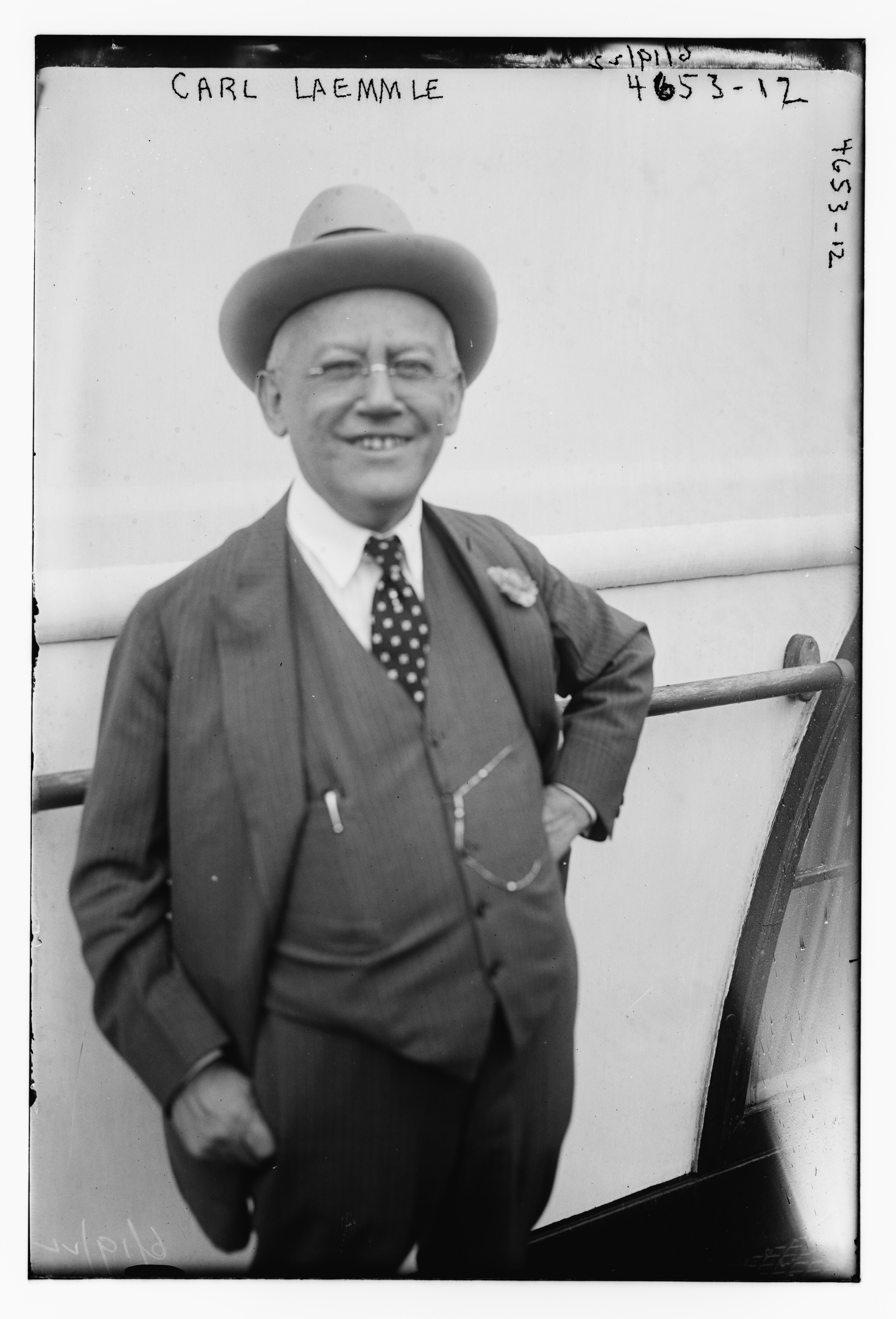
Carl Laemmle in 1918

Universal Logo 1915

In the book, "American Cinema's Transitional Era," the authors point out, The years between 1908 and 1917 witnessed what may have been the most significant transformation in American film history. During this "transitional era", widespread changes affected film form and film genres, filmmaking practices and industry structure, exhibition sites, and audience demographics. One aspect of this transition was the longer duration of films. Feature films (Note: A "feature film" or "feature-length film" is a narrative film (motion picture or "movie") with a running time long enough to be considered the principal or sole presentation in a commercial entertainment program. A film can be distributed as a feature film if it equals or exceeds a specified minimum running time and satisfies other defined criteria. The minimum time depends on the governing agency. The American Film Institute and the British Film Institute require films to have a minimum running time of forty minutes or longer. Other film agencies, e.g.,Screen Actors Guild, require a film's running time to be 60 minutes or greater. Currently, most feature films are between 70 and 210 minutes long.) were slowly becoming the standard fare for Hollywood producers. Before 1913, you could count the yearly features on two hands. Between 1915 and 1916, the number of feature movies rose 2 1/2 times or from 342 films to 835. There was a recurring claim that Carl Laemmle was the longest-running studio chief resisting the production of feature films. Universal was not ready to downsize its short film business because short films were cheaper, faster, and more profitable to produce than feature films. (Note: " Short Film" - There are no defined parameters for a Short film except for one immutable rule -the film's maximum running time. The Academy of Motion Picture Arts and Sciences defines a short film as "an original motion picture that has a running time of 40 minutes or less, including all credits".)

Laemmle would continue to buck this trend while slowly increasing his output of features. In 1914, Laemmle published an essay titled - Doom of long Features Predicted. In 1916, Laemmle ran an advertisement extolling Bluebird films while adding the following vocabulary on the top of the ad. (Note: The moving picture business is here to stay. That you must admit, despite carping critics and blundering sore-heads, true, some exhibitors have found business so good lately — but if you get down to facts when you look for a reason why, it's a 100 to 1 shot that they are, and for some time have been, dallying with a feature program. Some of these wise ones will tell you that business has picked up since they went into features, — BUT — ask them whether they are talking NET or GROSS. They will find they have an immediate appointment and terminate your queries unceremoniously. Funny how we like to kid ourselves, isn't it? The man who is packing 'em in and losing money on features is envied by his competitor, who is laying by a bit every day, and has a good steady, dependable patronage but admits to a few vacant seats at some performances. When this chap wakes up, he will realize that he has a gold mine and that good advertising will make it produce to capacity. The moral is that if you can tie up to the Universal Program, DO IT. If you can't NOW, watch your first chance. Let the people know what you have, and let the feature man go on to ruin if he wants to. You should worry! Motion Picture News - May 6, 1916) Carl Laemmle released 91 feature-length films in 1916, as stated in Clive Hirschhorn's book, The Universal Story.

==== Casting ====
All players in this film were under contract with Universal.

- Hobart Bosworth (1867–1943) was 48 years old when he played the heavy, John Nevill. This film was a radical departure from Bosworth's previous roles. "Heretofore Bosworth has been known to patrons of the films the world over as a leading man with no taint of the heavy about him." When Universal hired Emory Johnson in January 1916, Bosworth took the youngster under his wing. Bosworth and Johnson's first two movies for Universal were the feature-length Westerns – The Yaqui released March 1916 and Two Men of Sandy Bar released in April. Dr. Neighbor would be the first pairing of the Davenport-Johnson twosome in Carl Laemmle's search for screen chemistry. Later in the year, Emory would make two more films with Bosworth. They would continue collaborating in other films in the coming years. In Bosworth's long cinematic career, he appeared in nearly 300 films.
- Dorothy Davenport (1895–1977) was an established star for Universal. 21 year old Davenport played the flirtatious Beatrice Farley. She had acted in hundreds of movies by the time she starred in this film. The majority of these films were 2-reel shorts, as was the norm in Hollywood's teen years. She had been making movies since 1910. She started dating Wally Reid when she was barely 16, and he was 20. They married in 1913. After her husband died in 1923, she used the name "Mrs. Wallace Reid" in the credits for any project she took part in. Besides being an actress, she would eventually become a film director, producer, and writer.
- Emory Johnson (1894–1960) was Johnson 22 years old when he starred in this movie as Walter Croyden. In January 1916, Emory signed a contract with Universal Film Manufacturing Company. Carl Laemmle of Universal Film Manufacturing Company thought he saw great potential in Johnson, so he chooses him to be Universal's new leading man. Laemmle's hope was Johnson would become another Wallace Reed. A major part of his plan was to create a movie couple that would sizzle on the silver screen. Laemmle thought Dorothy Davenport and Emory Johnson could create the chemistry he sought. Johnson and Davenport would complete 14 films together. They started with the successful feature production of "Doctor Neighbor" in May 1916 and ended with The Devil's Bondwoman in November 1916. After completing the last movie, Laemmle thought Johnson did not have the screen presence he wanted. He decided not to renew his contract. Johnson would make 17 movies in 1916, including 6 shorts and 11 feature-length Dramas. 1916 would become the second-highest movie output of his entire acting career. Emory acted in 25 films for Universal, mostly dramas with a sprinkling of comedies and westerns.
- Gretchen Lederer (1891–1955) was a 25 year-old actress when she landed this role as Mrs. Nevill, the wife of John Nevill. Lederer was a German actress getting her first start in 1912 with Carl Laemmle. At the time of this film, she was still a Universal contract actress. She had previously acted in two Bosworth-Johnson projects preceding this movie - The Yaqui and Two Men of Sandy Bar. She would unite with Emory Johnson in the 1916 productions of A Yoke of Gold and The Morals of Hilda.
- Adele Farrington (Mrs. Hobart Bosworth) (c. 1867-1936) was 49 years old when she played Mrs. Lake. Farrington was also a Universal contract player appearing in 74 films between 1914 and 1926. Although she got her start in movies when she was 47-years-old (1914), Universal cast her mostly in character leads. Many of her roles were acting alongside her husband, Hobart Bosworth, whom she married in 1909 and divorced in 1920. In addition to her roles as an actress, she was also a music composer and writer.
- Jack Curtis (1880–1956) was 36 years old when he acted in this movie. His character was Peter Sturton, a former governor, supporting Croyden's bid for a second term. Curtis appeared in 157 films between 1915 and 1950.

==== Director ====
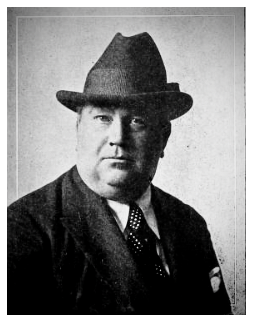
Director Lloyd B. Carleton

Lloyd B. Carleton (c. 1872–1933) started working for Carl Laemmle in the Fall of 1915. Carleton arrived with impeccable credentials, having directed some 60 films for the likes of Thanhouser, Lubin, Fox, and Selig. Between March and December 1916, 44-year-old Lloyd Carleton directed 16 movies for Universal, starting with The Yaqui and ending with The Morals of Hilda released on December 11, 1916. Emory Johnson acted in all 16 of these films. Of Carleton's total 1916 output, 11 were feature films, and the rest were two-reel shorts. After Emory Johnson signed his Universal contract in early 1916, Carl Laemmle, the owner of Universal Pictures, thought he had found a new leading man. Laemmle was looking for a male lead like Wallace Reid. He also wanted to develop a cinematic pair that would captivate audiences.

Johnson became Laemmle's choice for his new leading man. Laemmle chose Dorothy Davenport to spark screen chemistry with Johnson. She was a Universal contract player who was Wallace Reid's wife. Universal's top director, Lloyd B. Carleton, was tasked by Laemmle to direct all of this pair's films.

The collaboration of Johnson and Davenport resulted in 13 films, beginning with the release of Doctor Neighbor in May 1916. The last film in the series was The Devil's Bondwoman, released in November 1916. The majority of the movies were feature films. All the films featured Johnson and Davenport as the main stars.

Davenport became pregnant in October 1916, and her film output dropped sharply in early 1917. In the end, Laemmle felt Johnson was not talented nor charismatic enough. He would not be Universal's version of Wally Reid. Laemmle felt that the films needed more screen chemistry, even if they made money. In June 1918, Universal failed to renew the contract of Emory Johnson.

The table below lists the 13 films Johnson and Davenport collaborated on.

◆ Films starring Emory Johnson and Dorothy Davenport in 1916 ◆
Title	Released	Director	Davenport role	Johnson role	Type	Time	LOC	Brand	Notes
Doctor Neighbor	1 May	Carleton	Hazel Rogers	Hamilton Powers	Drama	Feature	lost	Red Feather	
Her Husband's Faith	11 May	Carleton	Mabel Otto	Richard Otto	Drama	Short	lost	Universal	
Heartaches	18 May	Carleton	Virginia Payne	S Jackson Hunt	Drama	Short	lost	Universal	
Two Mothers	1 Jun	Carleton	Violetta Andree	2nd Husband	Drama	Short	lost	Universal	
Her Soul's Song	15 Jun	Carleton	Mary Salsbury	Paul Chandos	Drama	Short	lost	Universal	
The Way of the World	3 Jul	Carleton	Beatrice Farley	Walter Croyden	Drama	Feature	lost	Red Feather	
No. 16 Martin Street	13 Jul	Carleton	Cleo	Jacques Fournier	Drama	Short	lost	Universal	
A Yoke of Gold	14 Aug	Carleton	Carmen	Jose Garcia	Drama	Feature	lost	Red Feather	
The Unattainable	4 Sep	Carleton	Bessie Gale	Robert Goodman	Drama	Feature	1 of 5 reels	Bluebird	
Black Friday	18 Sep	Carleton	Elionor Rossitor	Charles Dalton	Drama	Feature	lost	Red Feather	
The Human Gamble	8 Oct	Carleton	Flavia Hill	Charles Hill	Drama	Short	lost	Universal	
Barriers of Society	10 Oct	Carleton	Martha Gorham	Westie Phillips	Drama	Feature	1 of 5 reels	Red Feather	
The Devil's Bondwoman	11 Nov	Carleton	Beverly Hope	Mason Van Horton	Drama	Feature	lost	Red Feather	

==== Screenplay ====
The story was based on the successful play by Clyde Fitch (1865–1909) first shown on the New York stage on November 4, 1901. The story was adapted to the screen by F. McGrew Willis (1891–1957)

=== Filming ===
In this film, there was extensive use of San Diego locations for exterior shots, as well as multiple interior scenes..
An item published in the February 26, 1916 issue of Motion Picture News announced:

"The filming of the McGrew Willis adaptation of the Clyde Fitch play, 'The Way of the World,' was begun this week by Lloyd B Carlton. This production will have a number of expensive settings, including interiors of clubs, Monte Carlo, the executive mansion, and a church."

An item in the April 1, 1916 issue of The Moving Picture World stated:

"Lloyd Carlton is in San Diego making exterior and boat scenes in his production of F. McGrew Willis's film version of Clyde Fitch's drama of the speaking stage, 'The Way of the World.'"

The articles suggest that the project was filmed between February and April 1916.

==== Studios ====
On March 15, 1915, Laemmle opened the world's largest motion picture production facility, Universal City Studios.

While San Diego served as the setting for the exterior shots, news items show that the Universal City stages were used for a big scene. The March 1916 editions of New York Clipper and Moving Picture World contain articles that mention a ballroom scene created for this movie.

"One of the biggest sets ever built at Universal City was made especially for this scene, in which one hundred and fifty people took part."

"One scene is a huge ballroom, which made the many visitors "Oh!" when they noted the costumes of the ladies. It was a revelation to some of them. Some prominent society people took part."

=== Post production ===
The theatrical release of this film totaled five reels or 5,000 feet of film. As is often the case, the listed time for this feature-length movie varies. The average time per 1,000-foot 35mm reel varied between ten and fifteen minutes per reel at the time. Thus, the total time for this movie is computed between fifty and seventy-five minutes.

An article in the December 1916 issue of Photoplay points out:

"HOBART BOSWORTH expects to collect $50,000 (equivalent to $1,400,000 in 2023) from Universal for an alleged violation of contract The suit is based upon the company's action in featuring Dorothy Davenport as the star in 'The Way of the World.' a film version of the Clyde Fitch play, instead of Bosworth, which was contrary to the contract, according to the plaintiff."

== Release and reception ==
=== Official release ===
The copyright was filed with U.S. Copyright Office on June 8, 1916. and entered into the record as shown: (Note: The copyright was filed with U.S. Copyright Office and entered into the record as shown. THE WAY OF THE WORLD. Red Feather.: 1916. 5 reels. From the play by Clyde Fitch.; Credits: Producer, L B. Carleton; scenario, F. McGrew Willis © Universal Film Mfg. Co., Inc.; 8Jun16; LP8458)

In 1916, "Red Feather" movies were always released on Mondays. This film was officially released on Monday, July 3, 1916.

=== Advertising ===
Advertising plays a vital role in a movie's success by bringing customers to the theater. By providing details about plotlines, actors, release dates, and other key information, a successful marketing campaign boosts excitement among potential stakeholders. This knowledge empowered theater owners to make smarter booking decisions in a competitive market. In addition to an advertising campaign for a movie, Carl Laemmle added another wrinkle to assist potential stakeholders in deciding to view or book a new film.https://miva.edu.ng/?ref=mivaokpolokpo17388

In 1916, Universal became the first Hollywood studio to classify feature films based on production cost. One of the reasons behind this move was that the "Big Five" film studios owned their own movie houses, enabling them to have guaranteed outlets for their entertainment products. Unlike the majors, Universal did not own any theaters or theater chains. Branding all Universal-produced feature films would give theater owners another tool to judge the films they were about to lease and help fans decide which movies they wanted to see. (Note: Universal formed a three-tier branding system for their feature films based on the size of their budget and status. In the book "The Universal Story," the author Clive Hirschhorn describes the feature movie branding as: Red Feather Photoplays – low-budget feature films; Bluebird Photoplays – mainstream feature release and more ambitious productions; Jewel – prestige motion pictures featuring high budgets using prominent actors; In 1917, the Butterfly line, a grade between Red Feather and Bluebird, was introduced. During the following two years, half of Universal's feature film output was in the Red Feather and Butterfly categories. However, this was during a time when stars increasingly took the spotlight in advertising. The branding tags seemly ignored that the ticket-buying audience attended movies to see their favorite stars, not the vehicle allowing them to perform.)

In 1916, Universal produced 91 branded feature films, consisting of 44 Bluebirds and 47 Red Feather productions. This film was the 23rd release carrying the designation of Universal's "Red Feather" brand. The branding system had a brief existence and, by 1920, had faded away.

=== Reviews ===
The movie critic's reviews of the photoplay were mixed.

In the June 24, 1916 issue of the Motion Picture News, movie critic Peter Milne reviewed the film:

"It makes the entertainment of the average sort. Mr. Bosworth has not delineated his Nevill with the precision and skill that we have become accustomed to. Perhaps it is because he has almost always played the hero. He gives an entirely too likable impression during the first phases of the picture. The cropping out of the villainous characteristics in the final episodes hardly jibes correctly with the earlier impression gained from his acting."

In the July 1, 1916 issue of The Moving Picture World, the movie review by critic Robert C. McElravy:

"The interrupted wedding has long been a favorite theme in drama, but it cannot compare with the interrupted christening in this release. It is the climax of a long, carefully handled string of situations and gets over with strength and conviction. The performance Is a smooth and enjoyable one throughout. The production, free from padding, tells a well-rounded story and is altogether successful."

In the July 8, 1916 issue of The Moving Picture World, the movie critic observes:

"The story moves off slowly, but with constantly increasing interest. An interrupted christening, in which the jealous husband claims another is the child's father, makes the chief scene. This proves highly dramatic and is presented with conviction. The offering as a whole is well handled and tells a story of love and political intrigue. A satisfying subject."

== Preservation status ==
Many silent-era films did not survive for reasons as explained on this Wikipedia page. (Note: Film is history. With every foot of film lost, we lose a link to our culture, the world around us, each other, and ourselves. – Martin Scorsese, filmmaker, director NFPF Board A report by Library of Congress film historian and archivist David Pierce estimates that: around 75% of original silent-era films have perished; 14% of the 10,919 silent films released by major studios exist in their original 35 mm or other formats; 11% survive only in full-length foreign versions or film formats of lesser image quality.)

According to the Library of Congress, all known copies of this film are lost.

== Gallery ==
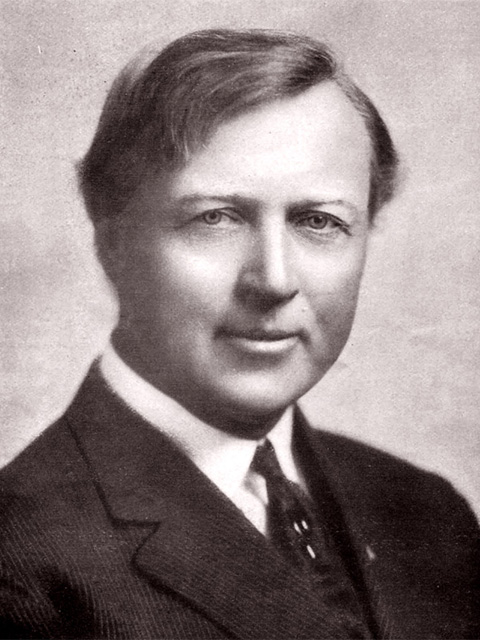
Hobart Bosworth in 1916

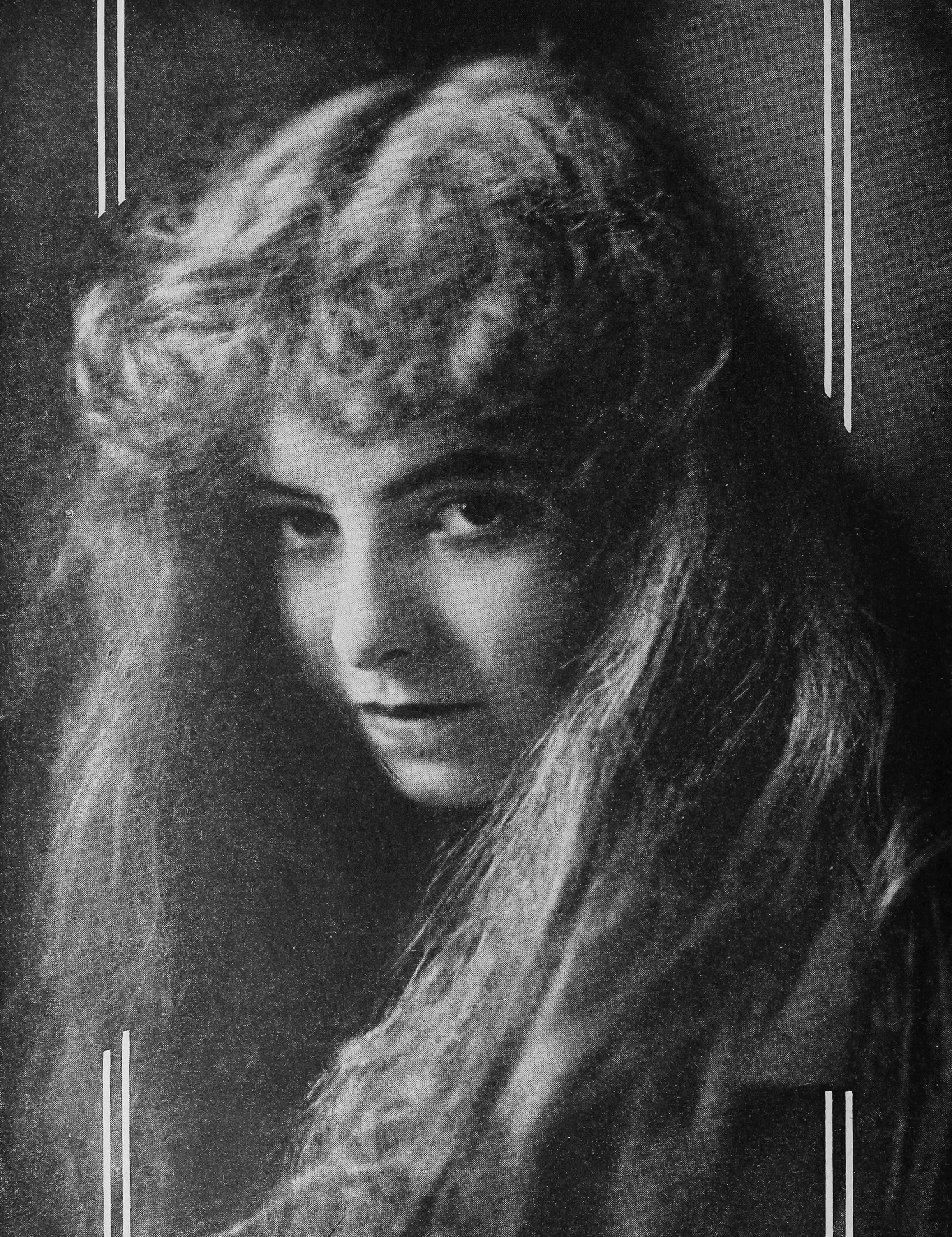
Dorothy Davenport in 1914

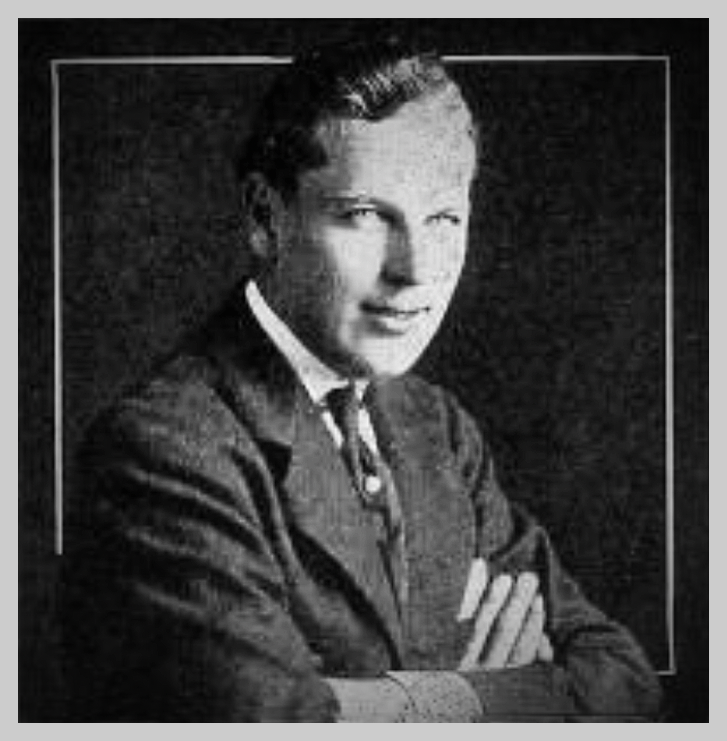
Emory Johnson in 1916

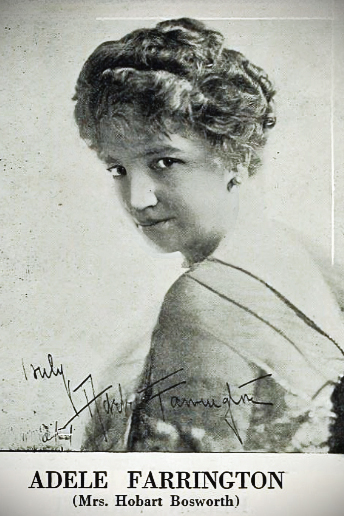
Adele Farrington in 1916

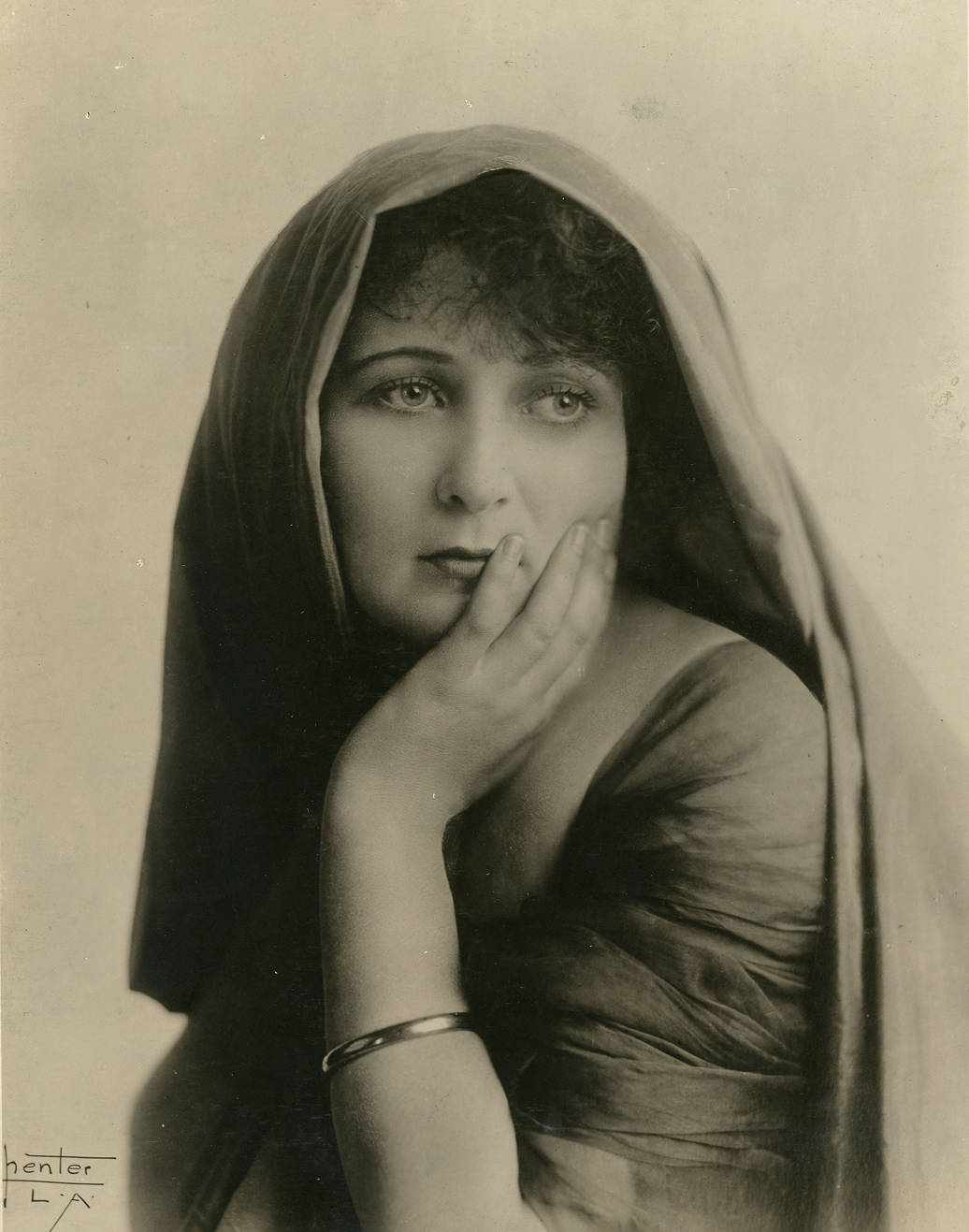
Gretchen Lederer in 1924

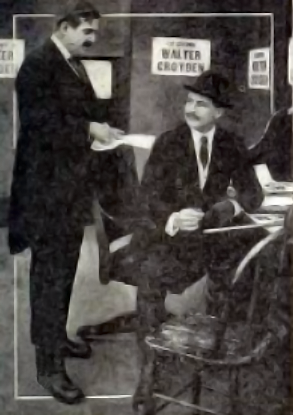
Movie still

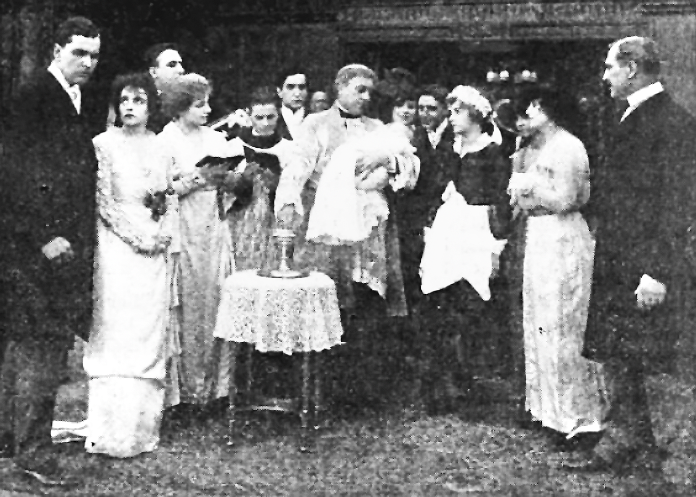
Still from the Christening scene

== Sources ==
- Braff, R.E. (1999). The Universal Silents: A Filmography of the Universal Motion Picture Manufacturing Company, 1912-1929. McFarland. ISBN 978-0-7864-0287-8.
- Fleming, E.J. (2010). Wallace Reid: The Life and Death of a Hollywood Idol. McFarland. ISBN 978-0-7864-8266-5.
- Hirschhorn, Clive (1983). The Universal Story - The Complete History of the Studio and its 2,641 films. New York: Crown Publishing Group. pp. 22–23. ISBN 0-517-55001-6.
- Kawin, Bruce F. (1987). How Movies Work. University of California Press. p. 46. ISBN 9780520076969.
- Keil, C.; Stamp, S. (2004). American Cinema's Transitional Era: Audiences, Institutions, Practices. ACLS Humanities E-Book. University of California Press. ISBN 978-0-520-24027-8.
