= The Way of the World (short story) =

1898 short story by Willa Cather

- Short story by Willa Cather
- Country: United States
- Language: English
- Genre: Short story

Publication
- Published in: Home Monthly
- Publication type: Women's magazine
- Publication date: April 1898

"The Way of the World" is a short story by Willa Cather. It was first published in Home Monthly in April 1898.

== Plot summary ==
Six boys live quietly together. Their main play is creating their "town": one boy is mayor, another a grocer, and so on. One day a girl, Mary Eliza Jenkins, makes friends with the mayor and the other "men", until they let her become a full citizen and open a new restaurant. It is a success until a boy from Chicago comes along and she devotes all her time to him. When the others tell her he must go, she decides to start her own town with him nearby. After her departure, no one is willing to put in any work at the game any more.

== References to other works ==
- Roman mythology and Roman history are alluded to through Latium, Coriolanus and the Volscians, and Gaius Marius.

== Literary significance and criticism ==
The ending of "The Way of the World" was later echoed in Flavia and Her Artists, with the reference to Caius Marius and the ruins of Carthage.
