= Coming, Eden Bower! =

1920 short story by Willa Cather

- Short story by Willa Cather
- Country: United States
- Language: English
- Genre: Short story

Publication
- Published in: The Smart Set
- Publication type: Literary magazine
- Publication date: August 1920

"Coming, Eden Bower!" is a short story by Willa Cather. It was first published in Smart Set in August 1920, and it was republished in Youth and the Bright Medusa under the title of Coming, Aphrodite, with minor alterations.

== Plot summary ==
Don Hedger, an unknown painter, lives in a Washington Square. A new neighbour, Eden Bower, moves in. She upbraids him for showering his dog in the bath tub. Later he gets to doing some cleaning and finds a hole through the closet, which looks onto her room. He spies on her whilst she is doing yoga. Later he stalks her and she shows an interest in his paintings. They go to a restaurant together and become friends.

One day, he goes to Coney Island to see a model of his, and she joins him. They go up in a balloon and she feels special until he tells her an atrocious story about Aztecs, which puts a damper on the whole day. Back in New York, they both sit on the roof and talk.

Sometime later, she is back from Burton Ives's, a successful painter who has suggested helping him. Don gets angry with her as he deems Burton Ives to be a bad painter. He decides to leave to Long Island for a while, but eventually comes back because he wants to see her again. However, by then she has gone to Europe.

Years later, Eden is back in New York after having great success in Paris. Whilst driving by Washington Square, she remembers her friend of old, and meets with Gaston Jules to ask him if her friend has gone up in the world. Don, she learns, is now a successful painter, even all the way to Paris, although he is considered avant-garde more than anything.

== Characters ==
- Don Hedger. He lives on Washington Square. He grew up in an orphanage and was later taught some literature by a priest in Greensburg, Pennsylvania. He has a dog, Caesar. He is now a painter and has done a lot of travelling.
- Mrs Foley, Don Hedger's janitress. She owns property in Flatbush, Brooklyn and her late husband was a Tammany.
- Eden Bower, Don Hedger's new neighbour. Her real name is Edna Bowers but she changed it for a real singer's name. She comes from Huntington, Illinois.
- Willy, a fourteen-year-old boy.
- Lizzie, a cleaning-lady.
- Mr Jones, a friend of Eden's, from Chicago. He is a music journalist.
- Molly Welch, the model whom Don meets with at Coney Island.
- Burton Ives, a successful painter. Don deems him vulgar.
- Alphonse, Eden's driver when she is back from Paris.
- Gaston Jules, an art dealer.

== Allusions to other works ==
- Don was told to read Miguel de Cervantes's Don Quixote, and The Golden Legend by the priest when he was younger.
- Frederic Remington is mentioned.
- Music such as Pagliacci and Giacomo Puccini can be heard near Washington Square.
- Edna's mother is said to have had a whole collection of books by Ouida
- Edna recalls reading Alphonse Daudet's Sapho and Théophile Gautier's Mademoiselle de Maupin whilst in Chicago.
- Clytemnestra is mentioned at the end.

== Allusions to actual history ==
- Don mentions the belief among Native Americans that woman had the power to control the rain and finds streams. He also mentions the Aztecs.

== Literary significance and criticism ==
It has been suggested that the story was influenced by Dante Gabriel Rossetti's poem Eden Bower, the singer Mary Garden and also Pierre Louys's novel Aphrodite. Others have put forth that the dog Caesar may have been taken from Mary Eleanor Wilkins Freeman's short story A New England Nun.
