= The Garden Lodge =

1905 short story by Willa Cather

- Short story by Willa Cather

Text available at Wikisource
- Country: United States
- Language: English
- Genre: Short story

Publication
- Published in: The Troll Garden
- Publication type: Short story collection
- Publication date: 1905

"The Garden Lodge" is a short story by Willa Cather. It was first published in her collection The Troll Garden in 1905.

== Plot summary ==
One day, Howard asks his wife if she would agree to tear down their garden lodge and build a new summer house there instead. She grows nostalgic as she remembers spending fond times there with tenor Raymond d'Esquerre when he was visiting. Although a moderate and no-nonsense woman, the singer rekindled her passion for music during his stay. She had to let go of it after her lazy brother killed himself and her father was crippled with debts. She then proceeds to go to the garden lodge and plays a piece of opera that she played with the tenor the previous summer. However, after a night's sleep she comes around and tells her husband she agrees the lodge should go.

== Characters ==
- Raymond d'Esquerre, a tenor.
- Caroline Noble, the protagonist.
- Howard Noble, Caroline's husband, a businessman from Wall Street.
- Heinrich, Caroline's brother, a painter. He shot himself at age twenty-six.
- Auguste, Caroline's father, a music teacher.
- Caroline's mother. She remains unnamed. She married her music teacher in Germany and they later moved to America together. She dies after her son's suicide.

== Allusions to other works ==
- Freya is mentioned.
- Caroline's father liked to talk about Schopenhauer.
- Caroline plays Richard Wagner's Die Walküre at the piano in the garden lodge. Moreover, Wagner's Parsifal is mentioned with Kingslor's garden.

== Literary significance and criticism ==
It has been suggested that the story deviates from normative gender roles: Auguste's romantic longing would seem more feminine, Caroline's strong-mindedness more masculine; further, Raymond seems doomed to playing the part of Kundry, 'a weary woman' in Parsifal.
