= The Marriage of Phaedra =

1905 short story by Willa Cather

- Short story by Willa Cather

Text available at Wikisource
- Country: United States
- Language: English
- Genre: Short story

Publication
- Published in: The Troll Garden
- Publication type: Short story collection
- Publication date: 1905

"The Marriage of Phaedra" is a short story by Willa Cather. It was first published in her collection The Troll Garden in 1905.

== Plot introduction ==
MacMaster visits a late painter's studio and attempts to collect information to write his biography.

=== Explanation of the title ===
'The Marriage of Phaedra' is an unfinished painting by Hugh Treffinger.

== Plot summary ==
MacMaster goes to Hugh Treffinger's studio in Holland Road, London. He is greeted by James, who shows him around. Later, he visits Lady Mary Percy, whom he had met in Nice four years back. She criticises Hugh for his lack of manners and for his pride. MacMaster takes to going to the studio to garner information from James. He meets Ellen Treffinger to tell her of his project of a biography. Later, he grows wary of an arts dealer, Lichtenstein. One day, James shows him an issue of The Times saying Ellen is engaged to get married, and she has sold The Marriage of Phaedra to the arts dealer. However, James has stolen the painting as Hugh had made it clear to him before his death that he did not want it sold. MacMaster conjectures they have to tell Ellen of the situation. When he visits her the next day, she says the painting will have to go.

== Characters ==
- MacMaster, the protagonist. He sets out to write a biography of Hugh Treffinger.
- Hugh Treffinger, a painter.
- James, Hugh Treffinger's valet.
- Lady Mary Percy, Ellen Treffinger's only sister.
- Lady Ellen Treffinger, Hugh Treffinger's widow.
- Ghillini, a friend of Hugh's.
- Lichtenstein, a Jewish arts dealer from Melbourne, Australia.
- Captain Alexander Gresham, Ellen Treffinger's new husband.

== Allusions to other works ==
- Hugh is said to have sought inspiration from Roman de la Rose, Boccaccio, and Amadis
- The painting itself mentions Phaedra, who marries Theseus and then falls for her stepson, Hippolytus.

== Allusions to actual history ==
- Charlemagne and Blanche of Castile are mentioned with regard to Hugh's paintings.

== Literary significance and criticism ==
The story may be inspired by Cather's 1902 visit of Edward Burne-Jones's studio in Kensington; she used the real name, James, of Burne-Jones's valet.

Further, the story has been deemed Jamesian for its narrative technique and its use of the painting as a means to convey meaning.
