= Two Men of Sandy Bar =

1916 western movie directed by Lloyd B. Carleton

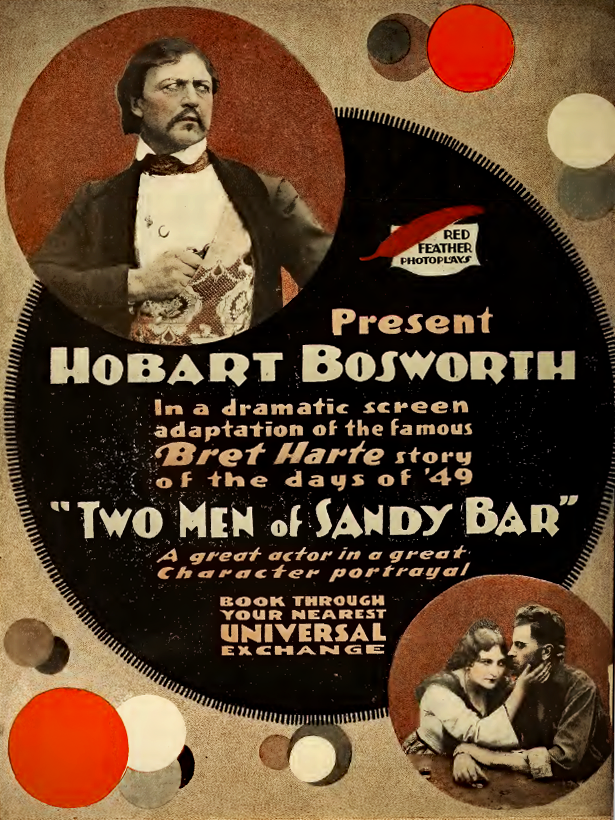
- Moving Picture World Ad
- Directed by: Lloyd B. Carleton
- Screenplay by: Olga Printzlau
- Story by: Bret Harte
- Produced by: Universal Red Feather
- Starring: Hobart Bosworth; Emory Johnson
- Production company: Universal
- Distributed by: Universal
- Release date: April 3, 1916 (Universal City)
- Running time: 5 reels
- Country: United States
- Language: English intertitles

Two Men of Sandy Bar is a 1916 American silent Western Melodrama directed by Lloyd B. Carleton and starring Hobart Bosworth, Gretchen Lederer along with Emory Johnson.

The film relies on a Bret Harte play penned in 1876. The film's main character is John Oakhurst, a well-known character to the readers of Bret Harte's books. Oakhurst is an honest gambler whose compassion for others both wins him friends and causes hardships.

The film was released on April 3, 1916, by Universal.

== Plot ==
The plot unfolds during the Gold Rush. Jack Oakhurst is a gentleman gambler. While playing poker one night, Oakhurst meets fellow gambler Sandy Morton. While the chivalrous Oakhurst is the consummate pro, Sandy Morton is the complete antithesis. Morton has a propensity towards excessive drink and is of low moral character. Despite these differences, they become fast friends.

Besides Sandy's daily struggles, he also grapples with his troubled past. Sandy's father, Alexander Morton, owns a banking business in San Francisco. Old man Morton's earnest desire was to integrate Sandy into the family business, but he could not condone Sandy's lifestyle and disowned him. The conflict drove Sandy to leave home at an early age and drift west.

One day, John Oakhurst pulls up stakes and boards a train for California. While traveling on the train, Oakhurst befriends an alcoholic gambler named John Pritchard. Pritchard is traveling with his wife, the Duchess. Oakhurst discovers Pritchard is running from the law. Soon, one sheriff pursuing Pritchard confronts the outlaw on the train, and a gunfight breaks out. Oakhurst rushes to the aid of his new acquaintance and wounds the sheriff. Before Pritchard flees the gunfight, he tells Oakhurst to take care of the Duchess. Oakhurst obliges Pritchard's request, and the two finish the trip together.

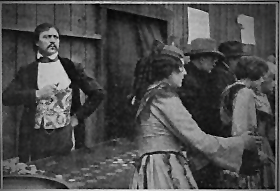

Both arrive at Sandy Bar. After settling in, Oakhurst finds out the Duchess is the Queen of the gambling halls. As time passes, the Duchess comes to admire Oakhurst's quick mental agility. She appreciates his physical skill with a pack of playing cards. The Duchess becomes captivated with Oakhurst.

One night as the Duchess glances around the gambling hall, she spots a new gambler who had drifted into town. She sashays to his table and finds out the young man's name is Sandy Morton. While playing poker, Oakhurst looks up and also recognizes his friend. Oakhurst reunites with his old friend.

The latest news arrives at Sandy Bar. John Pritchard has died. Believing Pritchard has passed, the Duchess feels the time is right for her and Oakhurst to get hitched. She asks Oakhurst to marry her, but Oakhurst refuses. The Duchess feels offended, and her spiteful alter ego emerges. One night, she exacts her revenge for Oakhurst's refusal. While Oakhurst is playing cards, she stacks his deck. The other players around the table soon believe they have caught Oakhurst cheating. The other gamblers call him out and brand him a cheat. Oakhurst's reputation is in tatters; He drifts South to take refuge from the Sandy Bar gaming halls.

An outraged Morton can't forgive Oakhurst's refusal to marry the Duchess. To atone for Oakhurst's rejection, Morton decides he will marry the Duchess. They become man and wife. After some time, the Duchess reveals her deceit with Oakhurst. The Duchess tells Morton about stacking the deck that destroyed Oakhurst's reputation. A furious Morton decides to parts ways with the duplicitous Duchess. He heads South hoping to locate his old friend. Time passes, and we discover a contented Sandy Morton has settled down. Sandy has become a servant for a wealthy Southern California mine owner, Don Jose De Castro.

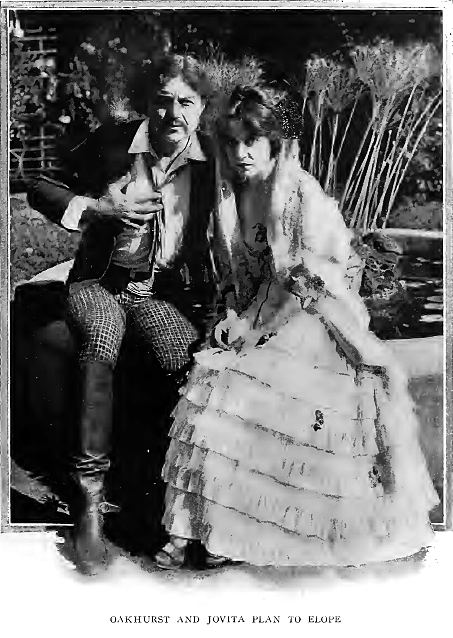

John Oakhurst reenters the picture. While drifting south, he has settled in the same town as Sandy Morton. While playing poker one night, Oakhurst meets a lovely Spanish girl. They fall in love. Jack's new love interest is Jovita. Oakhurst wants to marry the beautiful Jovita and start a new life. A significant problem arises when Oakhurst discovers she is the daughter of Don Jose De Castro. Jovita's father will not consent to the marriage of his daughter to a gambler. The couple continues to see each other in secret. They determine their only hope for marriage is to elope.

Time marches on, and we find out the Alexander Morton Sr., Sandy's father, has reconsidered his sentiments regarding his son. He believes "time heals all wounds." Morton Sr. believes his son has had sufficient time to mend his unruly behaviors. He wants to welcome his son into the banking business. He has combed the region for years, searching for his son. His search landed him in the same Spanish town as ack Oakhurst. Sandy Morton finds out his father is in town, but he can't face him after all these years and goes into hiding. Jack finds out Morton Sr. is in town searching for his long-lost son. Oakhurst, still choosing to cover his old friend, comes up with a plan.

Jack Oakhurst believes Sandy Morton died years ago. If Oakhurst can convince the elder Morton, he is his son; Morton Sr. will welcome him into the banking business. If Oakhurst can turn into a respectable banker, he believes Don Jose de Castro will allow him to wed his daughter. He tells Morton Sr. he is Sandy Morton, his long-lost son. Since it's been 25 years, the elder Morton takes him at his word and embraces Oakhurst as his son. Oakhurst moves to San Francisco and becomes a banker. Jack Oakhurst is a representative of the same bank where Don Castro does his business.

Sandy Morton finds out Oakhurst is impersonating him in his father's bank. Infuriated, he travels home and confronts his father with the truth. He reveals the entire deception. It stuns the elder Morton. Oakhurst feels the elder Morton will feel betrayed. Oakhurst turns to leave the room with his head bent in shame when the elder Morton calls him back. Morton Sr. declares he will excuse the duplicity. He further declares that the bank will change its name to Alex. Morton, Sons, and Oakhurst. Jack Oakhurst can finally marry Jovita Castro, and Sandy Morton can marry Mary Morris.

== Cast ==
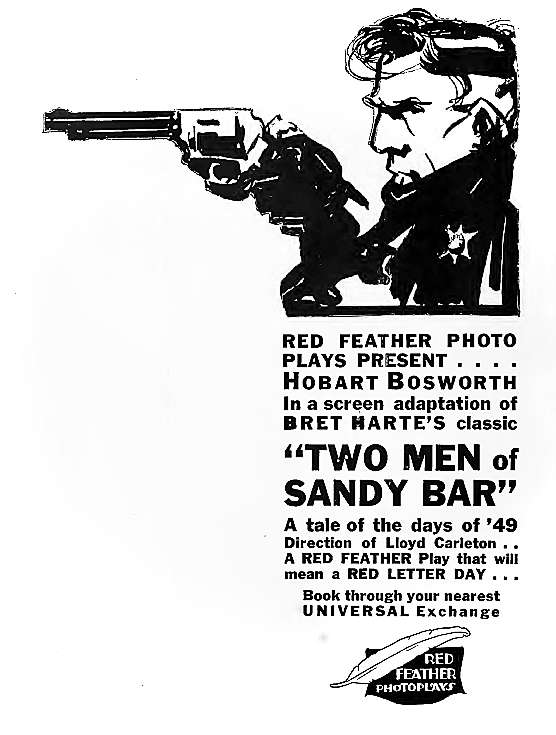

Actor	Role
Hobart Bosworth	John (Jack) Oakhurst
Jack Curtis	Henry Pritchard a convict
Charles H. Hickman	Colonel Culpepper Starbottle - legal advisor to Alexander Morton
Emory Johnson	Sandy Morton - The son of Alexander Morton Sr.
Yona Landowska	Dona Jovita Castro - wealthy mine owner
Gretchen Lederer	The Duchess - the wife of Pritchard
Frank MacQuarrie	Alexander (Old) Morton Sr. - owns a banking business in San Francisco
William V. Mong	Don Jose de Castro - Father of Jovita Castro
Jean Taylor	Mary Morris - a schoolmistress in love with Sandy Morton
Arthur Eugene (A.E.) Witting	Concho - Majordomo of Castro ranch

== Development ==
One big vice in a man is apt to keep out a great many smaller ones.

Never a lip is curved with pain that can't be kissed into smiles again.

— Bret Harte

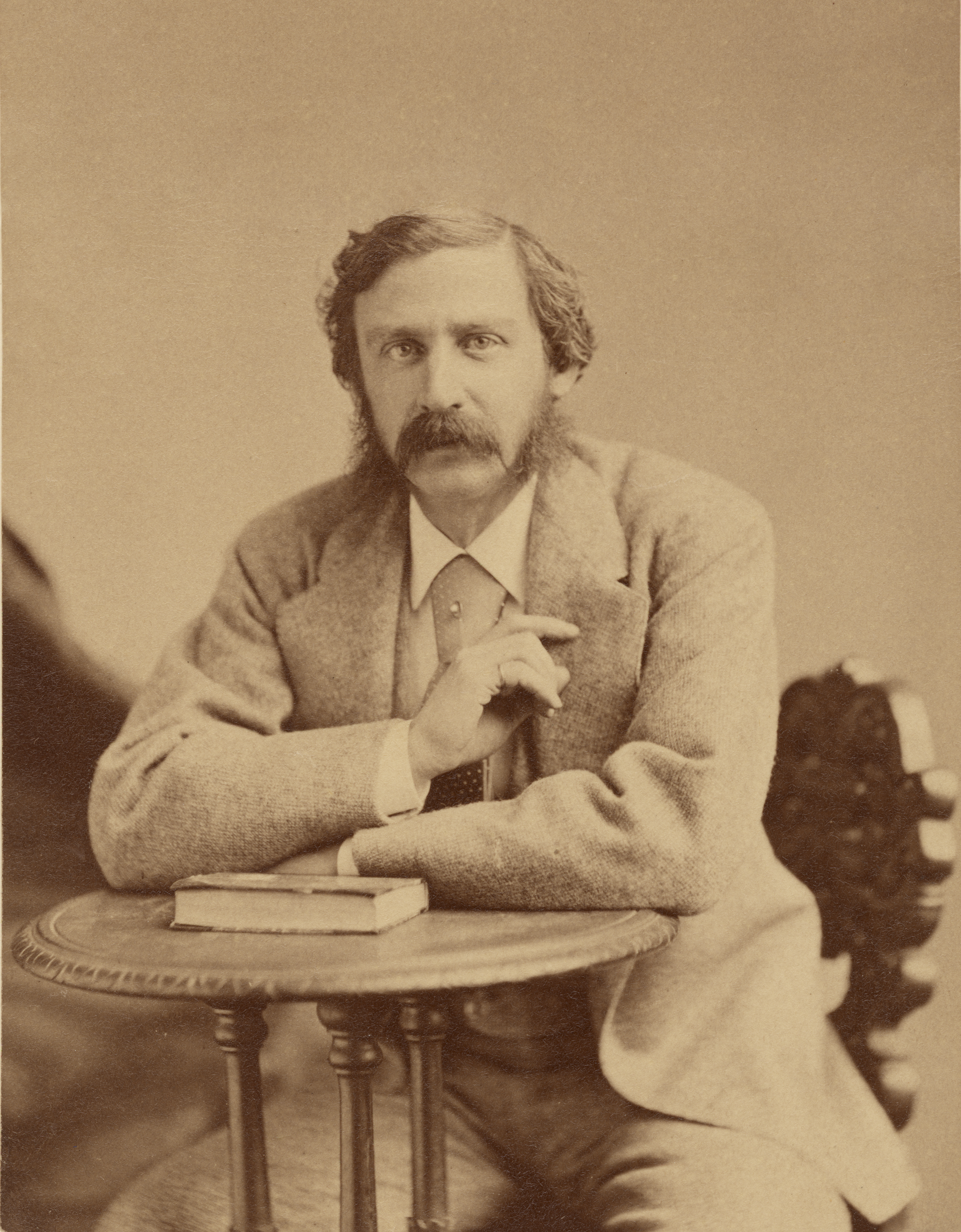

Bret Harte's (1836–1902), was an American short-story writer and poet. His best works featured miners, gamblers, and other characters of the California Gold Rush. His career spanned more than four decades. Harte's books including The Luck of Roaring Camp, The Outcasts of Poker Flat and M'liss, helped fashion the standards for writing Western fiction. All three books were adapted into silent films.

Harte was 39 years old when he fashioned his play "Two Men of Sandy Bar" by drawing from his grab-bag of previously created western characters. The original 1876 play was first staged in Chicago. Further performances were then staged in New York and London. The play received mixed reviews. The New York Times observed - "...the plot of the play is simply an amplification of the story "A Passage in the Life of Mr. John Oakhurst" originally published in the Sunday edition of The Times.

This film is a five-reel filmization of Bret Harte's 1876 play. This was the 4th time Hollywood had turned a Bret Harte story into a movie. After his death in 1902, they would turn 14 of his stories into films.

== Casting ==
- Hobart Van Zandt Bosworth (1867–1943) was 48 years old when he starred in this movie as John (Jack) Oakhurst. Bosworth was a well-known Universal actor. After Universal signed a 21-year-old Emory Johnson, Hobart thought he saw a potential mega-career for the 21-year-old. Hobart decided to mentor the young actor. After finishing The Yaqui released March 1916, they immediately started working on this film which was released in April. Later in the year, Emory would make two more films with Bosworth. They would continue collaborating in other films in the coming years. In Bosworth's long cinematic career, he appeared in nearly 300 films.
- Emory Johnson (1894–1960) was 22 years old when he acted in this movie as the son of Alexander Morton Sr. In January 1916, Emory signed a contract with Universal Film Manufacturing Company. Carl Laemmle of Universal Film Manufacturing Company thought he saw great potential in Johnson, so he chooses him to be Universal's new leading man. Johnson would make 18 movies in 1916, including eight shorts and 10 feature-length Dramas. 1916 would become the highest movie output of his entire acting career. Emory acted in 26 films for Universal, mostly dramas with a sprinkling of comedies and westerns.
- Gretchen Lederer (1891–1955) was 24 years old when she portrayed the Duchess. The German actress got her first start in 1912 with Carl Laemmle. At the time of this film, she was still a Universal contract actress. She would unite with Emory Johnson in the 1916 productions of A Yoke of Gold and The Morals of Hilda.

== Themes ==
The bonds of friendship are the constant theme pervading both the play and the film. Oakhurst represents the true friend who has your back when things go sideways. The struggles facing both Jack Oakhurst and Sandy Morton cements their friendship and ultimately turn their relationship into a life-long partnership.

== Screenplay ==
Olga Charlotte Printzlau (1891–1962) was 24 years old when she wrote the scenario for this photoplay which was based on the Bret Harte book. Her scenario used most of the characters in the original play, but her pacing was different along with her sequence of events. Even then, it was still difficult to follow - see § Release and reception. Printzlau was born in Philadelphia, Pennsylvania in 1891 and worked for various companies during her writing career. During the three years 1915 to 1918, she created Scenarios for Universal. Between 1915 and 1933, she wrote scenarios for 69 films.

== Filming ==
- Hobart Bosworth, Emory Johnson, Jack Curtis, Gretchen Lederer, Yona Landowska and Charles H. Hickman had all worked together filming The Yaqui. They were all Universal contract actors. The transition to this film was relatively easy.
- Isadore Bernstein was a staff writer at Universal. In hopes of capturing the same inspiration Bret Harte felt when he wrote the original stage play, Bernstein traveled to Sonora, California, "Queen of the Southern Mines." Once he arrived, he worked on the continuity for the film.
- Universal was committed to capturing the atmosphere of the early West depicted in the Bret Harte stories. Location scouting determined San Diego, California would best serve this purpose. Universal shot all of the film's exteriors in San Diego, California, and the surrounding area.
- To lend an air of authenticity to John Oakhurst's character, Hobart Bosworth wore an old-fashioned set of Mexican Spurs. The 40-year-old spurs were silver mounted with large rowels. They were the property of one of the oldest Spanish families in the area. See the Spurs in the Gallery photo with the caption - "Oakhurst kissing the hand of Jovita's."
- The article cited here opens with "The Universal leading ladies have been appearing lately in old fashioned gowns... " The article further states - "Gretchen Lederer in "Two Men of Sandy Bar" has taken infinite pains to reproduce the styles of the fifties in her customs and has succeeded admirably. Crinolines, introduced in the forties, had grown too large proportions. . . " All of this can be seen in the photograph of Gretchen Lederer shown in the Gallery section.

== Length ==
The theatrical release of this film totaled 5 reels. As is often the case, the listed time for this feature-length movie varies. The average time per 1,000-foot 35mm reel varied between 10 and 15 minutes per reel at the time. Thus, the total time for this movie is computed between 50 and 75 minutes.

== Advertising ==
This film carried Universal's "Red Feather" brand, designating a low-budget feature film.

== Reviews ==
The critics liked this film, especially Universal's picturesque settings, period costuming, romantic subject matter, and strong characters.

In the March 25, 1916 issue of the Moving Picture World, Robert C. McElravy reviews the movie:

It is unfortunate in a way that the story has so many winding threads, for this calls for short scenes and interferes seriously with the dramatic suspense at times. The interest is swept along from the beginning . . . The story gets an immediate hold and maintains it to the end.

In the March 25, 1916 issue of the Motion Picture News, Peter Milne wrote:

The story is complicated, and a little confusion results at times, but on the whole, the complications serve to hold the interest steadily. There is little opportunity for dramatic situations of any strength with such a complicated plot, but "Two Men of Sandy Bar" manages to entertain at all times, despite and because of its involved story.

In the April 8, 1916 issue of the Moving Picture World, a staff critic observes:

It is a very complicated story, in all of its windings, but follows clearly enough from scene to scene. It has some excellent character work and is superior to the average Western production nearly every way, except perhaps in dramatic strength.

== Preservation status ==
According to the Library of Congress website, this film has a current status of "No holdings located in archives," thus it is presumed all copies of this film are lost.

== Gallery ==
=== Players ===
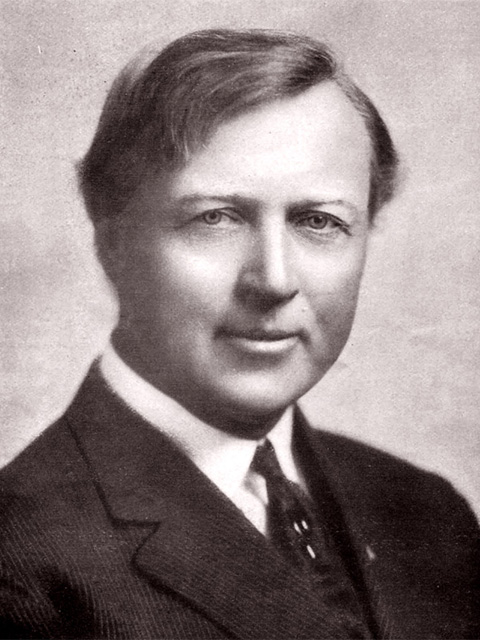
Hobart Bosworth
John (Jack) Oakhurst

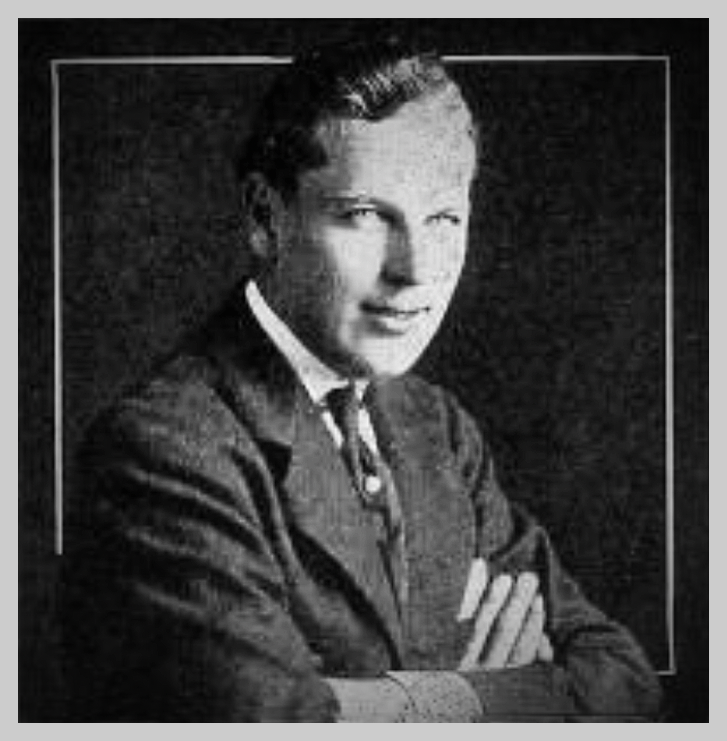
Emory Johnson
Sandy Morton

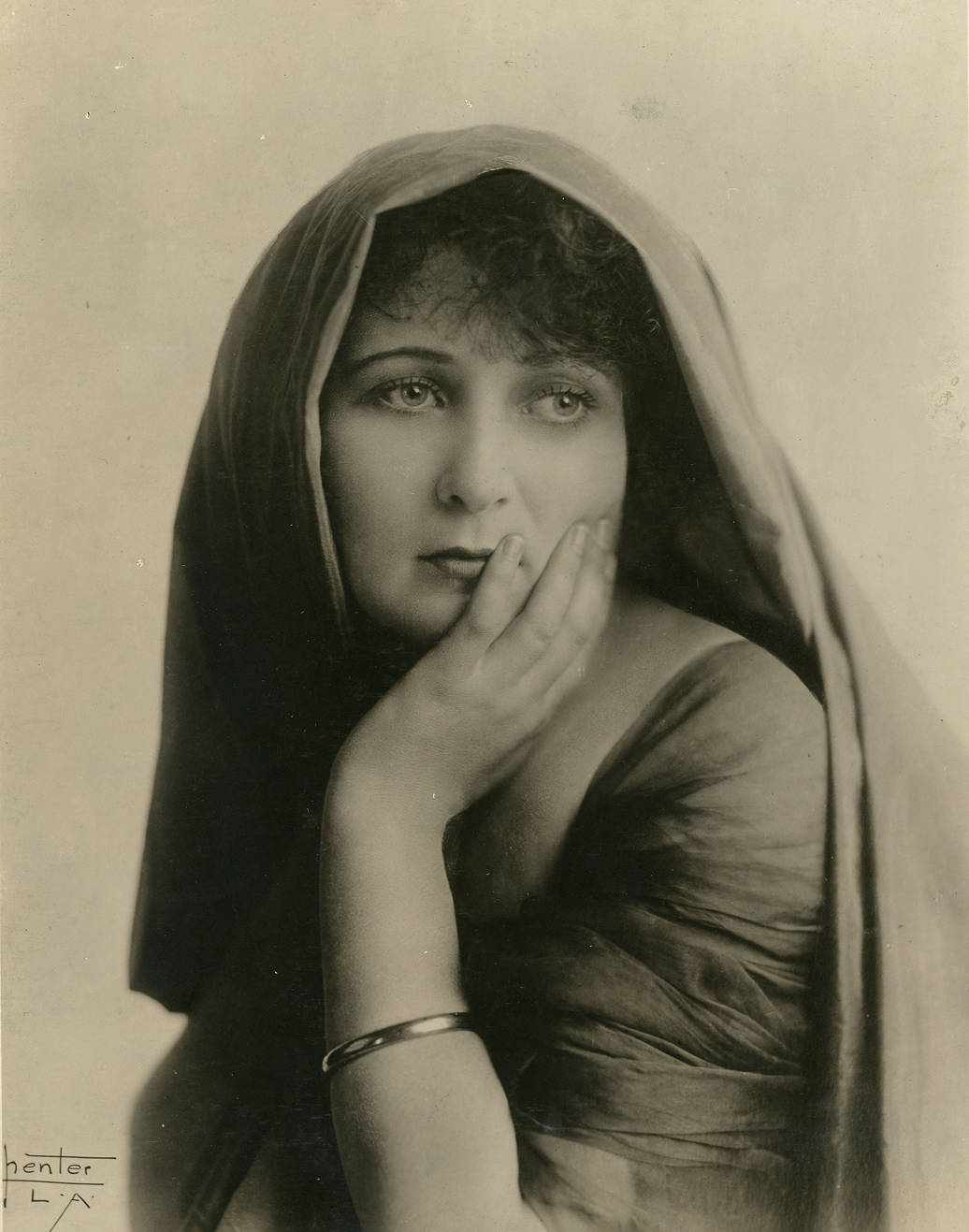
Gretchen Lederer
The Duchess

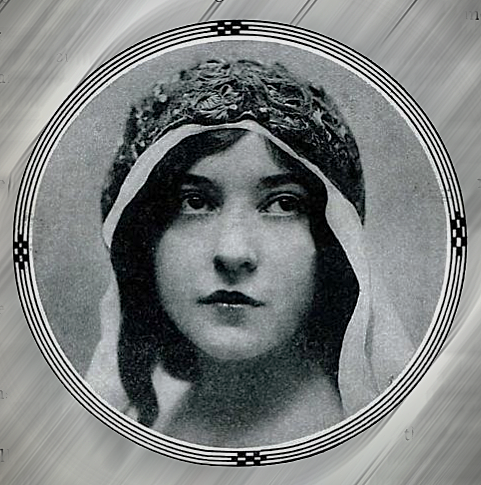
Yona Landowska
Dona Jovita Castro

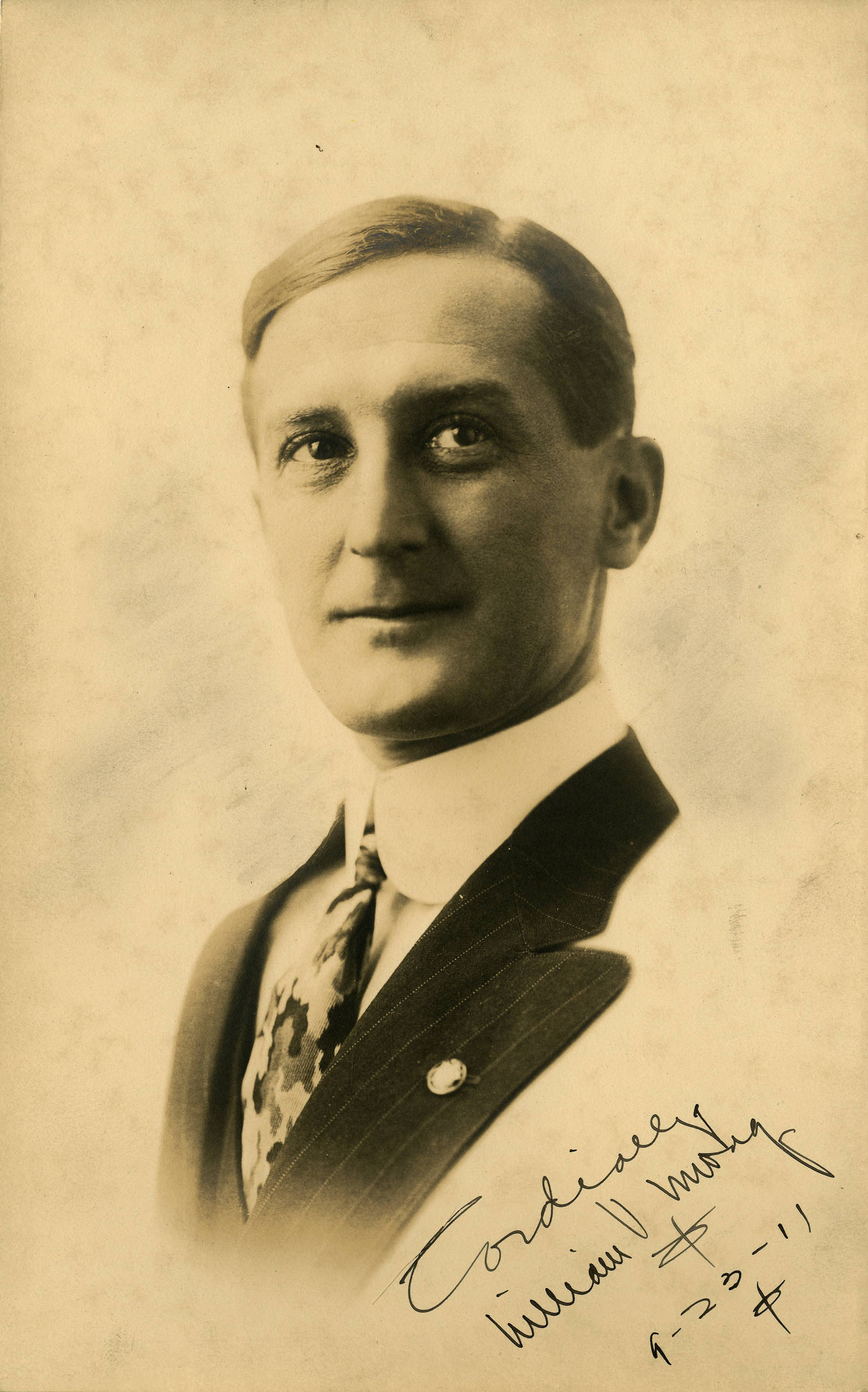
William V. Mong
Don Jose de Castro

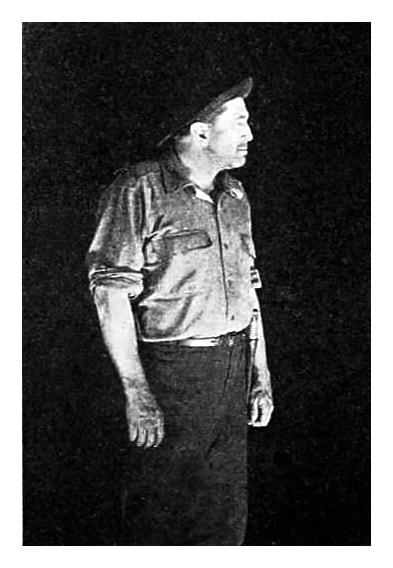
Jack Curtis
Pritchard

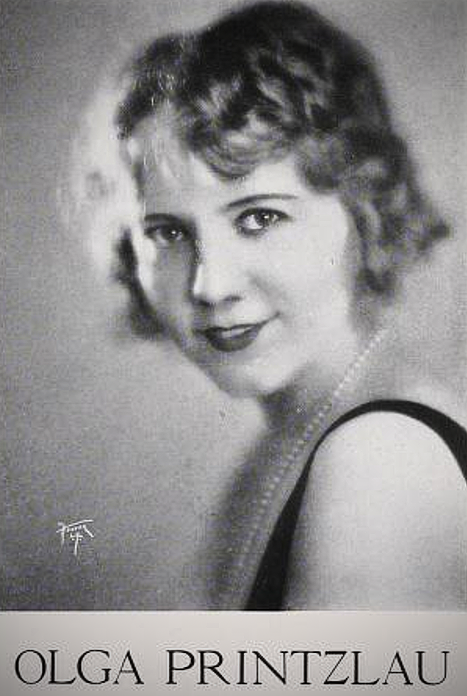
Adaptation
Olga Printzlau

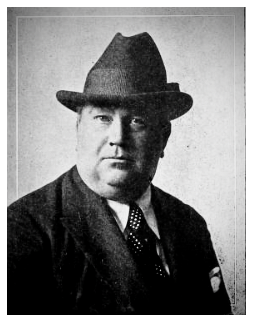
Director
Lloyd B. Carleton

=== Movie Stills ===
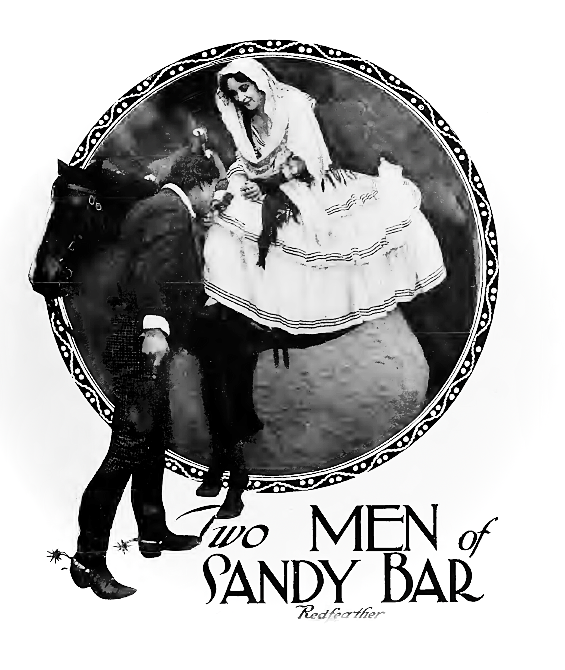
Oakhurst kissing the hand of Jovita

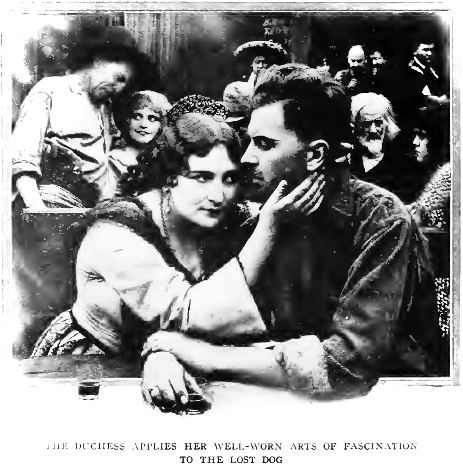
The Duchess applies her well-worn arts of fascination

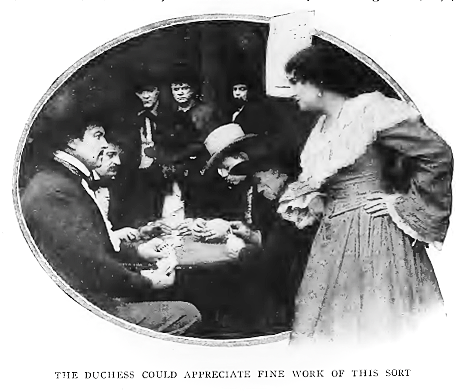
The Duchess could appreciate fine work

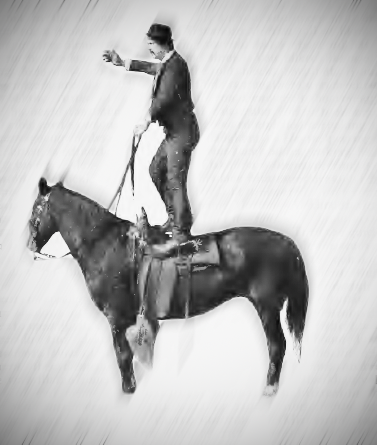
Oakhurst mounts the wall of the Castro Grounds
