= A Gold Slipper =

1917 short story by Willa Cather

- Short story by Willa Cather
- Country: United States
- Language: English
- Genre: Short story

Publication
- Published in: Harper's
- Publication type: Magazine
- Publication date: January 1917

"A Gold Slipper" is a short story by Willa Cather. It was first published in Harper's in January 1917.

== Plot summary ==
Marshall McKann, a businessman in the coal industry, is badgered by his wife into attending a concert at Carnegie Music Hall in the Oakland neighborhood of Pittsburgh, Pennsylvania, with her and her visiting friend Mrs. Post. Although he thought there were no tickets left, Mrs. Post has managed to get special seats on the stage. McKann is dressed inappropriately for a night out.

He gets bored throughout the concert, and the singer Kitty Ayrshire notices his yawns and glares. Later that night on his way to a train to New York City, he accepts a request to drive the singer to the station, as her car has stopped working. She only finds out it is him when they get to the railway station in East Liberty, as she couldn't see his face properly before that. Once on the train, she decides to join him and to ask him why he didn't like her performance. He says he is a serious businessman and he despises artists. She later tells her maid Celine she doesn't think he is very smart.

The next day he realises she has dropped one of her golden slippers, and decides to tuck it into his suitcase. At his hotel he bins it, but the cleaning-lady puts it back in his closet, thinking it must have been a mistake. He decides to keep it, and stashes it in a box for no one else to see.

Years later, he has become 'morbid', or depressed. Kitty, on the contrary, has forgotten all about it.

== Characters ==
- Marshall McKann. He is a Presbyterian and supports the Republican Party. He works as a coal businessman.
- Mrs McKann, Marshall's wife.
- Mrs Post, a friend of Mrs McKann's. She went to school with her. She now lives in Cincinnati.
- Kitty Ayrshire, an opera singer. She is Californian.
- Céline, Kitty's maid.

== Allusions to other works ==
- Kitty also appears in Scandal.
- Music is mentioned through the Ballets Russes, Wolfgang Amadeus Mozart, George Frideric Handel, Ludwig van Beethoven, and Faust.
- Kitty asks Mr McKann what he thinks of Leo Tolstoy's 1897 What Is Art?.
- Kitty later calls herself the Queen of Sheba, in that she is never afraid to learn more.

== Literary criticism and significance ==
Wayne Koestenbaum, in The Queen's Throat, suggested that Mr McKann might be 'a drag queen at heart'.
