= The Yaqui =

1916 melodrama movie directed by Lloyd B. Carleton

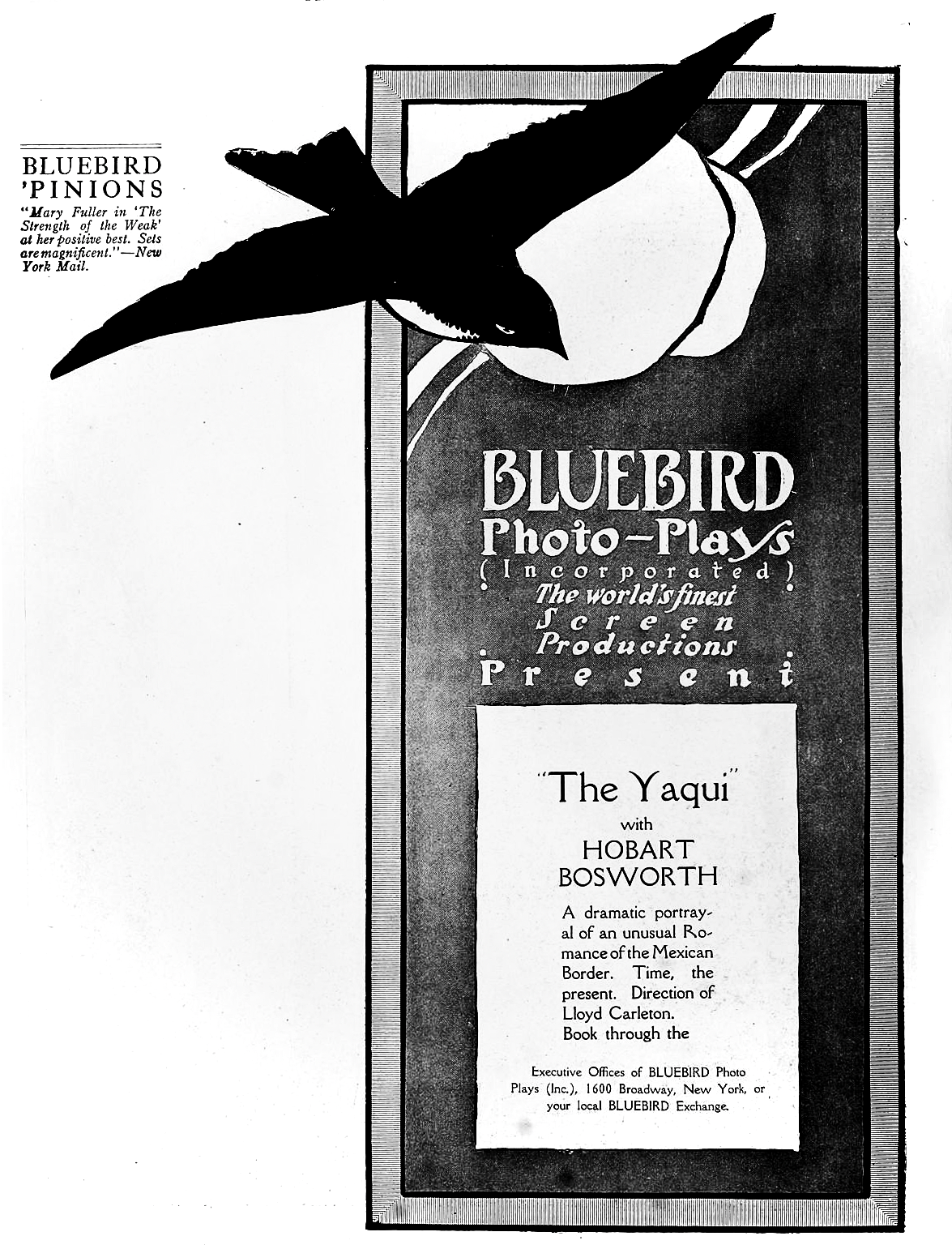
- Directed by: Lloyd B. Carleton
- Screenplay by: Olga Printzlau
- Story by: Dane Coolidge
- Produced by: Universal Bluebird
- Starring: Hobart Bosworth; Emory Johnson
- Production company: Universal
- Distributed by: Universal
- Release date: March 19, 1916
- Running time: 5 reels
- Country: United States
- Language: English intertitles

The Yaqui is a 1916 American silent Black and white Melodrama directed by Lloyd B. Carleton and starring Hobart Bosworth, Gretchen Lederer and Emory Johnson. The film depicts Yaqui Indians entrapped by nefarious elements into enslavement for a wealthy plantation owner. They struggle in captivity, eventually rebelling against their owner's oppression.

The film was released on Mar 19, 1916 by Universal.

== Plot ==
Flores is a prosperous Mexican plantation owner, but he desperately needs workers for his plantation in the Yucatán Peninsula. General Martinez is an Indian-hating commander of a Mexican garrison in the northern district of Mexico. The garrison's headquarters are in the center of the Yaqui Indian nations. Since Flores has specific labor needs, he visits the northern district.

Flores visits the garrison's headquarters and approaches General Martinez. He asks Martinez if he knows of any means of securing a contingent of Indians to work his fields. The two men draw up a plan which will mutually benefit both. The general's scheme is quite simple. He plans to attend a local Yaqui festival; then, during the celebration, he will publicly insult the Yaqui leaders' wife - Modesta. Martinez knows Tambor, the Yaqui leader, will not let the slight go unchallenged.

At the festival of Santa Catalina, Martinez approaches Tambor's wife. He forcefully takes her in his arms and attempts to kiss her. Upon witnessing the general's insult to his wife, a mortified Tambor reacts angrily. He grabs his wife, and they return to their home. After a history of tribal abuse at the army's hands, this incident becomes the straw that broke the camel's back. The Yaqui rebels and start an insurrection. Unknowingly, the tribe has played right into Martinez's hands.

Tambor's expected reaction provokes Martinez's military response. After the general suppresses the rebellion, he arrests the leaders, including Tambor. Martinez decides he must execute the chief conspirator of the uprising - Tambor. Someone in the crowd yells his avowed hatred of Tambor. He wants to handle the execution personally. Martinez gives him the gun, and the man shoots Tambor. The chief crumples into a pre-dug grave, and they cover the grave. But all is not as it seems. The executioner was part of a counter-plan. He had removed most of the powder in the cartridge, making the shot non-lethal, and Tambor was not hurt. Later, they exhumed his buried body and revived him.

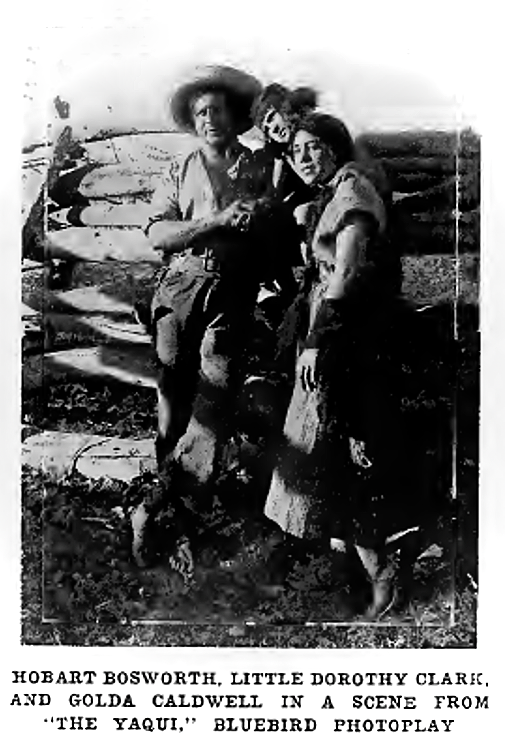

Later on, the subjugated Yaqui tribesmen load trucks for their long trek south to the Flores plantation. Since we presume Tambor dead, his wife Modesta and his daughter Lucia are part of the Yaqui captives. The clever Tambor disguises himself and joins the caravan to the plantation. He will reunite with his family.

After arriving at the plantation, Flores forces the Yaqui to work in the tropical sun for long hours. Shortly after their arrival, Tambor and his family reunite, but Tambor's daughter falls ill with a fever. Flores believes the work is more important than a single individual. They do not allow Tambor and Modesta to treat their daughter, and they must work in the fields instead. Because their daughter lacks any care, she dies.

One night, Flores entices Modesta to come to the big house. After her arrival, he tries to rape her. Instead, then enduring this humiliation, Modesta stabs herself with her dagger. Tambor arrives at the big house, sees Modesta, overwhelmed with emotion. He pulls the knife from Modesta's' prone body and stabs Flores to death. Tambor gathers his tribe, and they head back to their homelands. Tabor plans to exact revenge from the repressive General Martinez.

Meanwhile, we come to find out both Martinez and Lt. Hernandez, the Generals' second in command, is in love with a wealthy land owners' daughter. Ysobel is the daughter of Señor Esteban and Señora Esteban. Ysobel loves Hernandez, but her parents want her to marry the wealthier general. Both continue to vie for her affections. Lt. Hernandez is slowly becoming sympathetic to the plight of Yaquis.

Tambor and his fellow Yaquis arrive in northern Mexico and gather their forces. General Martinez, sensing danger, places his troops on high alert. A sensational battle ensues. The Yaquis are victorious. Later there is a personal duel between Martinez and Tambor. After an exchange of gunfire, Martinez is lying dead on the ground. When the smoke settles, and everything returns to normal - Hernandez marries Ysobel.

== Cast ==
Actor	Role
Hobart Bosworth	Tambor
Goldie Colwell	Modesta
Dorothy Clark	Lucia
Emory Johnson	Flores
Jack Curtis	General Martinez
Louis A. Valderna	Lt. Hernandez
Charles H. Hickman	Señor Esteban
Gretchen Lederer	Señora Esteban
Yona Landowska	Ysobel

== Production ==
=== Pre production ===
==== Development ====
According to the book - The Universal Story, Carl Laemmle (c. 1867-1939) produced around 91 feature movies in 1916.
Lloyd B. Carleton (c. 1872–1933) started working for Carl Laemmle in the Fall of 1915. Carleton arrived with impeccable credentials, having directed some 60 films for the likes of Thanhouser, Lubin, Fox, and Selig.
Between March and December 1916, 44-year-old Lloyd Carleton directed 16 movies for Universal, starting with The Yaqui and ending with The Morals of Hilda. Emory Johnson acted in all 16 of these films. Of Carleton's total 1916 output, 11 were feature films, and the rest were two-reel shorts.
Hobart Bosworth became afflicted with tuberculosis (TB) early in his career. After a relapse in 1906, he decided to head to the dry climes of the Southwest. He ended up recovering in Tempe, Arizona. A stage actor with a deteriorating voice would find little work on Broadway. Silent movies provided the perfect venue for the next stage of his acting career. By 1916, Bosworth was a well-known actor in silent films. He was cast for the lead in The Yaqui. Bosworth recommended Universal film some of the exteriors in Tempe. After the completion of the film, Tempe began a long connection with Hollywood.
Two Yaqui-themed photoplays preceded Universal's "The Yaqui." The first film was an American short, The Yaqui Girl. The film was released on December 31, 1910. The film is directed by James Young Deer and starred Virginia Chester. "The Yaqui Girl" was filmed in New Jersey and Santiago Canyon, California. The movie is about a beautiful young Indian maiden who falls in love with a Mexican cavalier.
The second film was The Yaqui Cur, a 1913 short film directed by D.W. Griffith. The production was shot entirely in California and featured a romance between a Native American woman and a white man. Prints of the film still exist.

==== Casting ====
- Hobart Van Zandt Bosworth (1867–1943) was 48 years old when he starred in this movie as Tambor. Bosworth was a well-known Universal actor. After Universal signed a 21-year-old Emory Johnson, Hobart thought he saw a potential mega-career for the 21-year-old. Hobart decided to mentor the young actor. After finishing The Yaqui released March 1916, they immediately made another feature-length Western - Two Men of Sandy Bar released in April. Later in the year, Emory would make two more films with Bosworth. They would continue collaborating in other films in the coming years. In Bosworth's long cinematic career, he appeared in nearly 300 films.
- Emory Johnson (1894–1960) was 22 years old when he portrayed Flores. In January 1916, Emory inked a contract with Universal Film Manufacturing Company. Universal's Carl Laemmle thought he saw great potential in Johnson, so Laemmle laid plans for Johnson to become one of Universal's leading men. Emory Johnson acted in 26 films for Universal, mostly dramas with a sprinkling of comedies and westerns. Johnson would make 18 movies, the highest output of his career, in 1916, including eight shorts and ten feature-length dramas.
- Gretchen Lederer (1891–1955) was 24 years old when she portrayed Señora Esteban. The German actress got her first start in 1912 with Carl Laemmle of Universal Film Manufacturing Company. At the time of this film, she was still a Universal contract actress. She would unite with Emory Johnson in the 1916 productions of A Yoke of Gold and The Morals of Hilda.

==== Themes ====
The film's release was fortunate considering the events of 1916. The Yaqui Indian tribes were based both in Mexico and Arizona, with the lion's share located on the border's Mexican side. The Mexican Yaquis were engaged in a perpetual struggle with the Mexican army and the ruthless plantation owners. In the preceding decades, thousands of Yaquis had died. While these developments provided headlines for the American newspapers, the Yaqui Wars also kept the newspapers stoked. And if this wasn't enough, Pancho Villa continued to generate headlines by battling with the Mexican army and being chased by the American Army.

==== Screenplay ====
In 1913, author Dane Coolidge wrote a novel titled Land of Broken Promises. The novel was published in the 1913 November issue of Munsey's Magazine pages 313 - 404. The magazine paid Coolidge $2,500 (equivalent to $62,056 in 2018) for publishing rights to the novel. In 1915, Coolidge expanded "The land of Broken Promises" into another novel titled - The Desert Trail. Coolidge's next movie success would be the story Rimrock Jones sold to Famous Players–Lasky and released under that title on January 21, 1918.

In addition to writing novels, Coolidge also tried to write movie scenarios. Over time, he would write four scenarios. A movie company accepted only one. The Yaqui, adapted from his novel "The Land of Broken Promises," was purchased by Universal for $400 (equivalent to $9,929 in 2018). Universal bought the scenario to protect itself, because credit for the screen adaptation is given to well-known scenario writer - Olga Printzlau

=== Filming ===
This exteriors for this film were shot in both Mexico and Tempe, Arizona. Universal felt shooting major parts in Mexico would lend an air of authenticity to this film. The post-publicity hype; both locations were only a "few hundred miles" west from Columbus, New Mexico.
The town of Columbus was very much on the minds of most Americans. On March 9, 1916, Pancho Villa ordered nearly 100 Mexican members of his extremist group to make a cross-border raid to Columbus, New Mexico. After the raid, Eighteen Americans and 80 Villistas lay dead. The raid had, in turn, prompted a US response on March 15 with the expedition into Mexican territory led by General John Joseph "Black Jack" Pershing.

=== Post production ===
==== Studios ====
The theatrical release of this film totaled 5 reels. (Note: As is often the case, the listed time for this feature-length movie varies. At the time, the average time per 1,000-foot 35mm reel varied between 10 – 15 minutes per reel. Thus, the total time for this movie is computed between 50 – 75 minutes.)
Based on an American Film Institute standard, films with a running time of forty minutes or longer are considered feature films.

==== Music ====
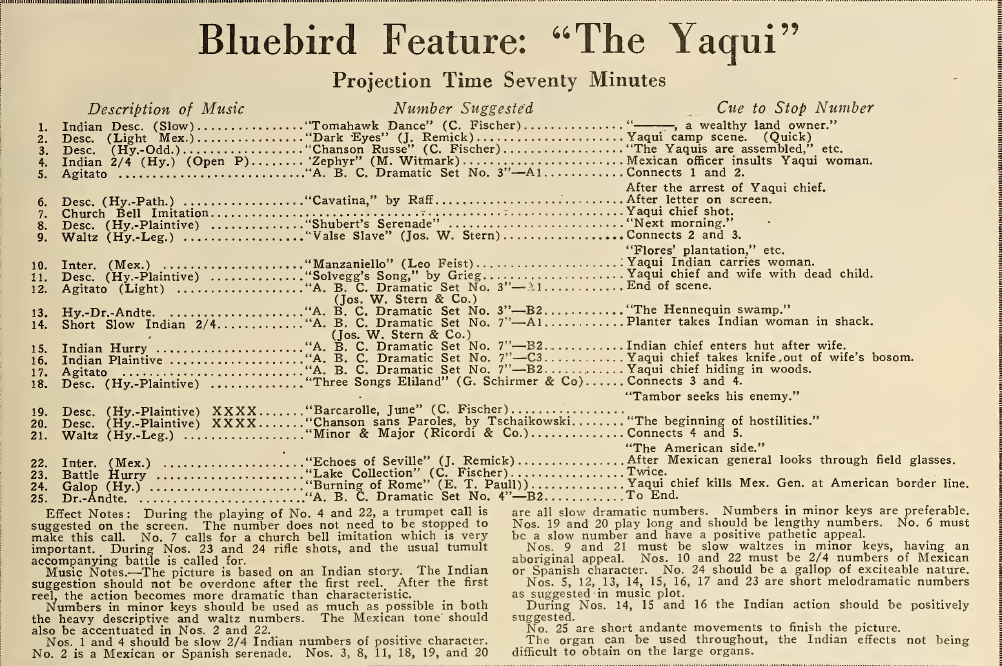

M. Winkler is the musical arranger for this film. Max Winkler, often listed as M. Winkler or Moe Winkler, was not a musician or music composer. He was a salesman for band and orchestra music. Max worked for a publishing house in New York City called Carl Fischer Music. While working as a clerk, he amassed tremendous working knowledge of thousands of pieces of music. He could recall almost in an instant. He used this knowledge to create a list of music he believed provided the film's best background music. Once the compiled list was complete, he would publish these suggestions in the form of a "Cue Sheet." Theater musicians could follow the "Winkler Cue Sheet creating the perfect musical accompaniment for the film.

Since Max was not a musician, his musical selections sometimes generated controversies. The criticism's basis was that only a true musician could develop a proper musical ambiance for a movie. Max Winkler compiled a complete score for the film when it was released. There is also an alternate musical cue sheet (pictured above) developed by Ernst Luz.

== Release and reception ==
=== Official release ===
This film was officially released on July 13, 1916. (Note: The copyright was filed with U.S. Copyright Office and entered into the record as shown: The Yaqui. 1916 5 reels (c) Bluebird Photoplays, Inc 21Feb16; LP14068)

=== Advertising ===
This film carried Universal 's "Bluebird" brand, denoting a mid-range budget.

==== Critical response ====
Critical reaction to the film mainly seemed favorable.

In the March 16, 1916 issue of the Motion Picture News, Harvey F. Thew wrote:

When there is something in a play which makes one angry and fills one with sympathy for the wronged person who lives only for revenge, the play ought to be considered "gripping." This is the case with "The Yaqui. The subject is melodramatic but seldom have we seen melodrama better produced.

In the March 16, 1916 issue of the Variety, Jolo opined:

Genuine natives were judiciously employed, and there is a wealth of atmospheric detail. The picture bristles with action and should prove an interesting programic feature.

In the March 18, 1916 issue of The Moving Picture World, Margaret MacDonald wrote:

Especially apropos of the times is the five-reel production which claims to turn the limelight of truth on the condition of the Yaqui Indian, who has been not alone dispossessed of his lands by maltreated by the wealthy Mexican landowner. The production is a well-constructed one and will be enjoyed for its sincerity and artistic qualities.

== Preservation status ==
With every foot of film that is lost, we lose a link to our culture, to the world around us, to each other, and to ourselves.
Martin Scorsese, filmmaker, director NFPF Board

According to the Library of Congress, all known copies of this film are lost. (Note: A report by Library of Congress film historian and archivist David Pierce estimates that: around 75% of original silent-era films have perished; 14% of the 10,919 silent films released by major studios exist in their original 35 mm or other formats; 11% survive only in full-length foreign versions or film formats of lesser image quality.; Many silent-era films did not survive for reasons as explained on this Wikipedia page.)

== Gallery ==
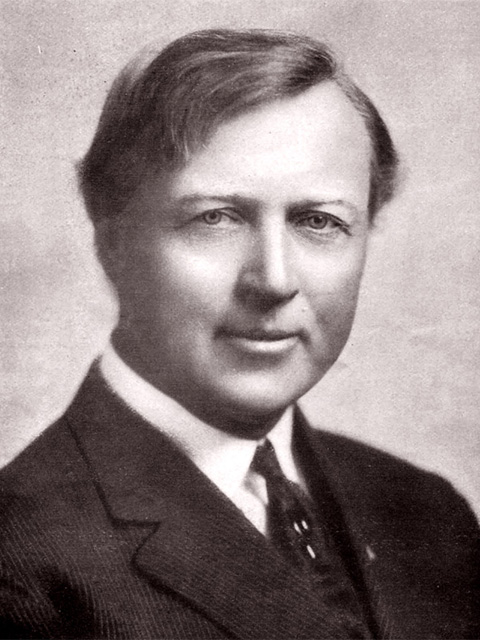
Hobart Bosworth in 1916

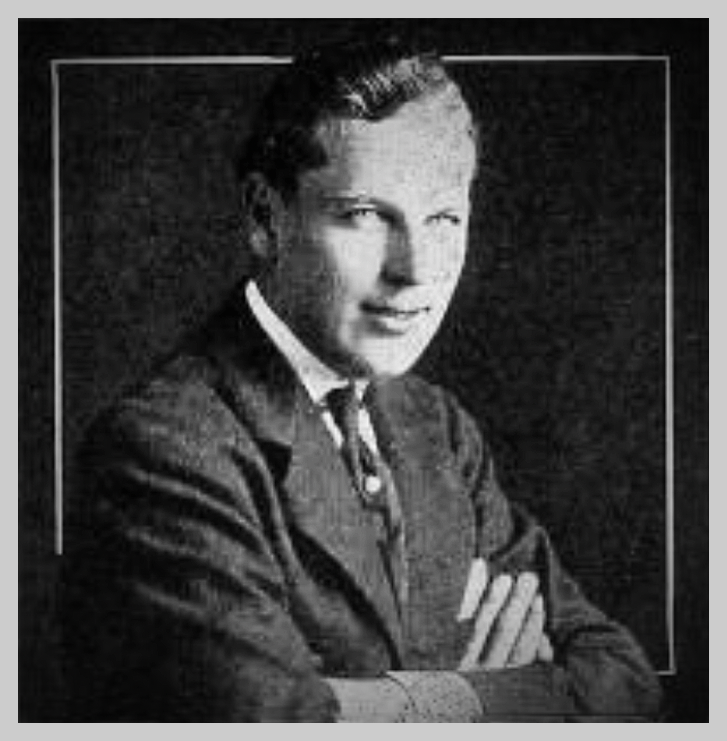
Emory Johnson in 1916

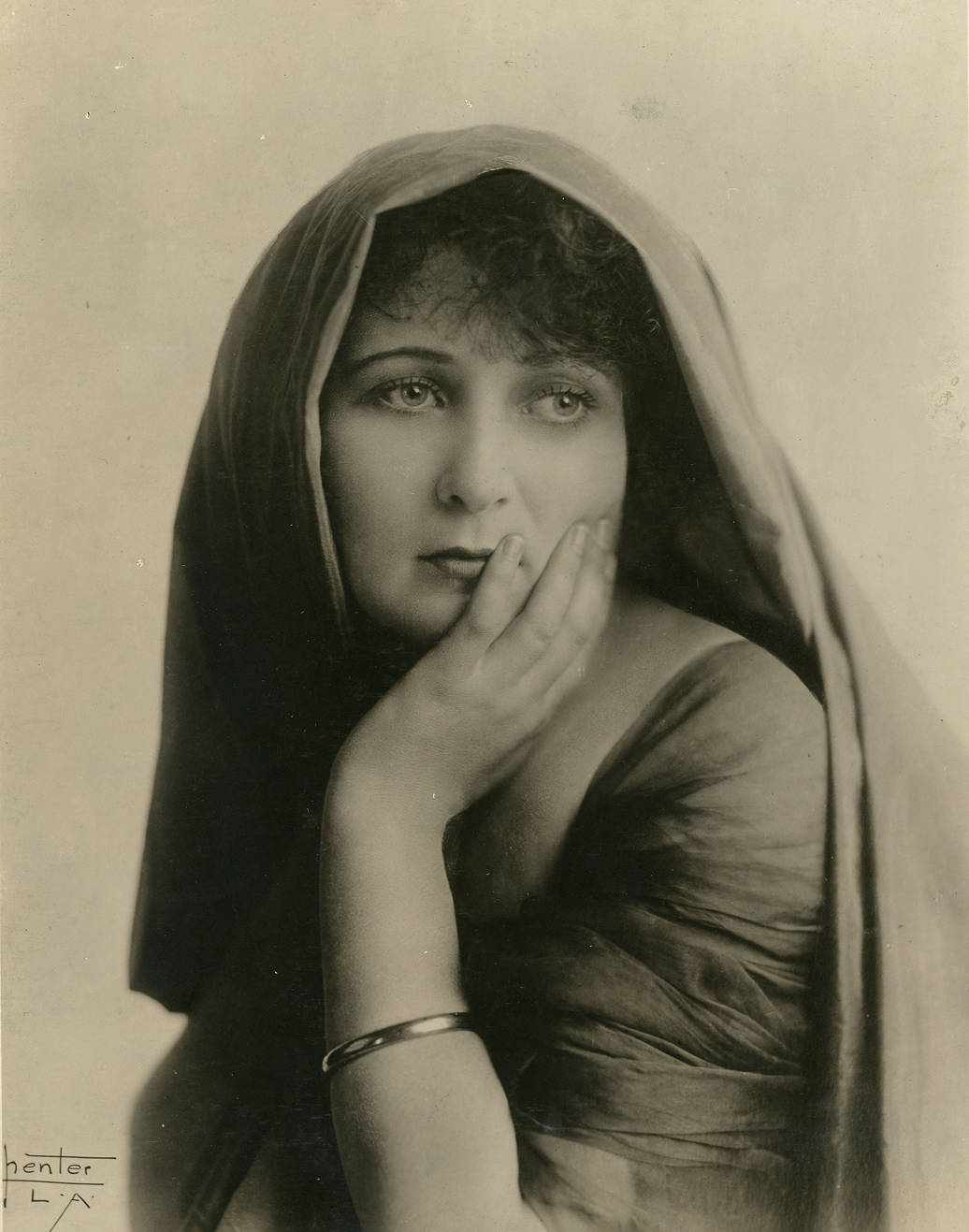
Gretchen Lederer in 1924

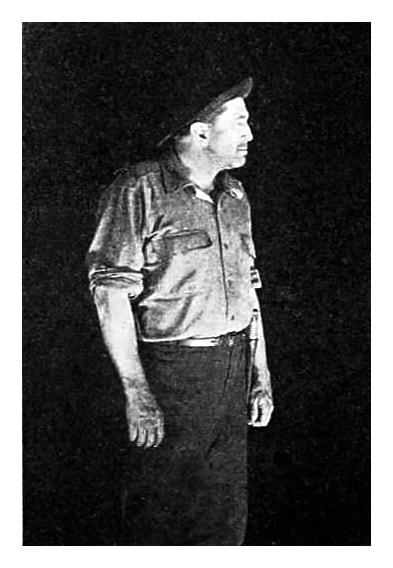
Jack Curtis in 1921

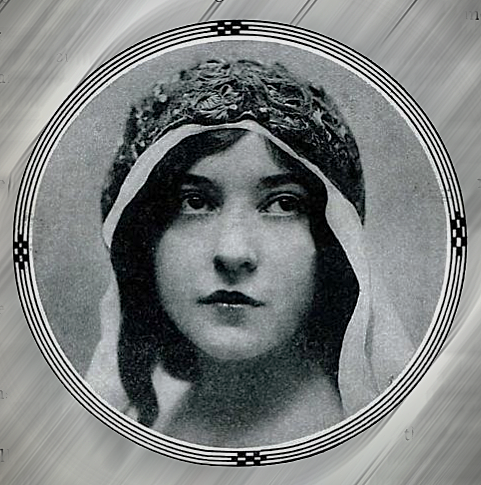
Yona Landowska in 1915

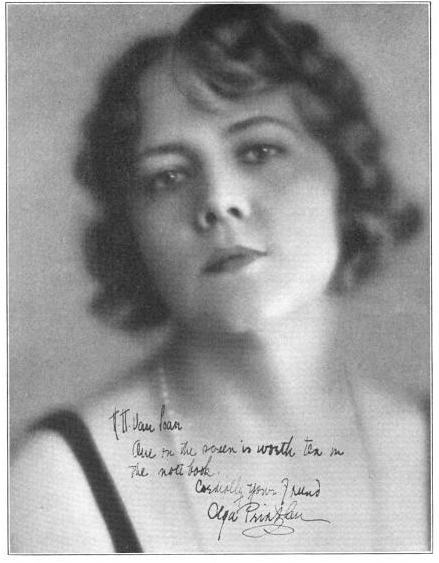
Olga Printzlau scenario

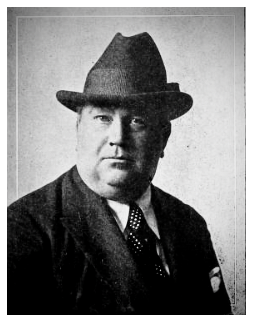
Lloyd B. Carleton Director
