= Flavia and Her Artists =

1905 short story by Willa Cather

- Short story by Willa Cather

Text available at Wikisource
- Country: United States
- Language: English
- Genre: Short story

Publication
- Published in: The Troll Garden
- Publication type: Short story collection
- Publication date: 1905

"Flavia and Her Artists" is a short story by American writer Willa Cather. It was first published in The Troll Garden in 1905.

== Plot introduction ==
Imogen visits her friend Flavia, where she is to join a retinue of artists. However, things do not pan out as well as planned.

== Plot summary ==
Imogen takes a train to Tarrytown, New York, where she has been invited by her friend Flavia. The latter picks her up from the station and drives her to her house. Later Miss Broadwood introduces herself and begs her not to think of her as another 'artist'; she will be her confidante. Arthur joins them to say hello and prepare the dinner. At supper, the artists have agitated conversations M. Roux remains distant. When asked about Flavia about his idea that women cannot be intellectual, he admits he has never met such a one. Later, Imogen thinks back to her childhood days when Arthur would read her children's stories. Before bed, he asks his wife why she invited Imogen, who is not a fickle artist; she said she owes it to her mother. M. Roux is to leave the next day.

The next day, Imogen has breakfast with Miss Broadwood, and they are joined by Arthur and his sons, who are to go off for the day so as not to unsettle the artists. Together, the two women wonder how Arthur can put up with his wife, why he ever married her; Miss Broadwood goes so far as to suggest she has no real sense of what art really is.

Later, back from a hike, Imogen and Arthur come upon the other artists, who seem agitated. They have been reading a satire on Flavia by M. Roux in a newspaper article; Arthur vows not to let his wife hear of it, lest it should hurt her feelings. At dinner, Flavia praises her slanderer, and Arthur lashes out about artists. Some of the artists decide to leave the next day. Flavia then argues with Imogen over Arthur's manners, although Imogen cannot tell her why he acted that way. She confides in Miss Broadwood that she is disheartened with Flavia; she shall leave the next day. Arthur takes her to the station.

== Characters ==
- Imogen Willard. She studies philology.
- Flavia Malcolm, a patron of the arts. She is thirty-five years old. She is bossy and pretty, but somehow 'always ill at ease'.
- Arthur Hamilton, Flavia's meek husband
- M. Emile Roux, a French writer from Paris, who has written twelve novels. He later publishes a satirical article about Flavia.
- Ivan Schemetzkin, a Russian pianist. He is small and fat.
- Jules Martel, a painter.
- Signor Donati, an Italian tenor. He is very small. He smokes cigarettes.
- Professor Schotte, a scholar on Assyria.
- Restzhoff, a Russian chemist.
- Alcee Buisson, a philologist.
- Frank Wellington, a novelist. He is from Kansas and went to Harvard. He has published three historical novels.
- Will Maidenwood, the editor of Woman. He is convalescent.
- Jemima Broadwood, Flavia's second cousin and a stage actress.
- Fray Lichtenfeld, a German writer.

== Allusions to other works ==
- Arthur is said to have read Lewis Carroll's Alice in Wonderland and Jabberwocky, as well as Hans Christian Andersen's The Little Mermaid out to Imogen when she was a child.
- Flavia mentions Elizabeth Barrett Browning, George Eliot, and George Sand when she asks M. Roux about intellectual women.
- Schemetzkin plays some Chopin after the first dinner.
- Music is also mentioned by Arthur, with Erlking.
- Miss Broadwood compares the children's dialogue to something out of Maurice Maeterlinck.
- Flavia is said to have garnered information from others about the Barbizon school and Henrik Ibsen's Hedda Gabler.
- Flavia compares her husband to Banquo, from William Shakespeare's play Macbeth.

== Allusions to actual history ==
- M. Roux compares himself to Jaufré Rudel in his quest for an intellectual woman.
- Imogen compares the household she leaves at the end to Caius Marius and the ruins of Carthage.

== Literary significance and criticism ==
The ending of Flavia and Her Artists foreshadows The Way of the World, with the reference to Caius Marius and the ruins of Carthage.
