= That's the Way of the World (disambiguation) =

That's the Way of the World is a 1975 album by Earth, Wind & Fire.

That's the Way of the World may also refer to:

- That's the Way of the World (film), a 1975 film, featuring the music of Earth, Wind and Fire
- "That's the Way of the World" (Earth, Wind & Fire song), 1975
- "That's the Way of the World" (D Mob song), 1990
- That's the Way of the World: Alive in 75, an album by Earth, Wind & Fire
