= Paul's Case =

1905 short story by Willa Cather

- Short story by Willa Cather

Text available at Wikisource
- Country: United States
- Language: English
- Genre: Short story

Publication
- Published in: McClure's
- Publication type: Magazine
- Publication date: 1905

"Paul's Case" is a short story by Willa Cather. It was first published in McClure's Magazine in 1905 under the title "Paul's Case: A Study in Temperament", which was later shortened. It also appeared in a collection of Cather's stories, The Troll Garden (1905). For many years "Paul's Case" was the only one of her stories that Cather allowed to be anthologized.

== Overview ==
New York City was historically known as a destination for those seeking adventure and new opportunities, and often described as a center of fine living and society. It was considered at the time of the publication of "Paul's Case" as “the symbol of ultimate glamour and cosmopolitan sophistication”. Indeed, in the story, New York City is described as lavish and extraordinary, in contrast to the descriptions of Paul's home, Pittsburgh, which he despises.

Paul, a high school student from Pittsburgh, is frustrated with his dull middle-class life. This frustration, mixed with a desire for a luxurious lifestyle, leads him to deliberately separate himself from those in his life, resulting in feelings of isolation. Paul's teachers and even his father refer to Paul as a "case", viewing him as an example of someone to be studied, handled, and managed; the term enables Cather to adopt "the voice of medical authority".

== Plot ==
The short story "Paul's Case" centers on a young boy who struggles to fit in both at home and at school, where he has been suspended. At a meeting with his principal and his teachers complain about Paul's "defiant manner" in class and his "physical aversion" to them. In the evening, Paul works as a "model" usher at Carnegie Hall in Pittsburgh. After helping seat the patrons in his section, he stays for the concert and enjoys the social scene while losing himself in the music. After a concert one evening, Paul follows the soloist and imagines life inside her hotel room. As Paul heads home afterward and walks through his neighborhood, the reader learns that Paul and his father have a poor relationship. Returning home very late that night, Paul enters through the basement window to avoid a confrontation with his father, then lies awake for the rest of the night in the basement, imagining what would happen if his father mistook him for a burglar and shot him. Not only does Paul wonder if his father will recognize him in time, but he also entertains the idea of his father possibly regretting not shooting him when he had the chance to do so.

Paul feels out of place with the people on Cordelia Street, where he lives, because they remind him of his own lackluster life. Although his father considers himself a role model for Paul, Paul is unimpressed by this plodding ironworker who is married with four children. While Paul longs to be wealthy, cultivated, and powerful, he lacks the stamina and ambition to change his condition. Instead, Paul escapes his monotonous life by visiting Charley Edwards, a young actor. Later, Paul makes it clear to one of his teachers that his ushering job is more important than his schoolwork, leading his father to terminate Paul's work as an usher. The boy is removed from school and put to work at an entry-level office job, and Charley is ordered not to see Paul again.

In his new job, one of Paul's responsibilities is to carry deposits to the bank. One day, he steals the cash entrusted to him and takes a train to New York City, where he buys an expensive wardrobe, rents a room at the Waldorf-Astoria Hotel, and explores the city. There he meets a 'wild San Francisco boy, a freshman at Yale, who claims to have run down for a "little flyer" over Sunday. He takes Paul on an all-night tour of the city's lively social scene, and for the next few days, Paul lives like a rich, privileged young man. The spree brings him more contentment than he has ever known. However, on the eighth day, after spending most of his money, Paul reads in a Pittsburgh newspaper that his theft has been made public and that his father, having reimbursed Paul's employer, is on his way to New York City to bring the boy back home. Paul, who earlier had purchased a gun, briefly considers shooting himself to avoid returning to his old life. Eventually, he decides against using the gun, but the thought of returning to his old lifestyle impels him to kill himself by jumping into the path of a train.

== Literary criticism and significance ==
Paul's Case has been called a "gay suicide". Many critics have attributed his suicide to the forces of alienation and stigmatization facing a young, possibly homosexual, man in early 20th-century America. In 1975, Larry Rubin wrote The Homosexual Motif which includes the reinterpretation of the story since the stigma on sex has eased. He identifies small details which he claims support a gay reading of Paul. For example, Rubin refers to the way Paul is described as "dressing as a dandy". The violet water (a perfume Paul owns), and his choice of company are construed as signs of feminine tendencies. Jane Nardin also explores the possibility that Paul's character is gay, and that this is a metaphor for a general feeling of being an outsider or not fitting in with a specific group of people. Author Roger Austen states that Paul might be understood as a homosexual character because of the "depiction of a sensitive young man stifled by the drab ugliness of his environment and places the protagonist in an American literary tradition of 'village sissies'".

Wayne Koestenbaum reads the story as a possible portrait of Willa Cather's "own desire for aesthetic fulfillment and sexual nonconformity". Another critic, Tom Quirk, reads it as an exploration of Cather's belief in the "irreconcilable opposition" between art and life.

In response to Michael Salda's "What Really Happens in Cather's 'Paul's Case'?", where Salda says Paul did not kill himself, Martha Czernicki suggests, in "Fantasy and Reality in Willa Cather's 'Paul's Case'", that Paul's trip to New York is a fantasy or dream, but his suicide is not.

James Obertino of the University of Central Missouri suggests that Paul may suffer from post-traumatic stress disorder.

Hayley Wilhelm of the University of New Haven, suggests the possibility that Paul has autism due to certain signs and symptoms he displays throughout the story.

Rob Saari, in "'Paul's Case': A Narcissistic Personality Disorder", considers whether the main character, Paul, has a Narcissistic Personality Disorder. The DSM-IV essential features match the personality traits that Paul had throughout the story. Saari also suggests that because of this disorder, Paul needs to associate with people of a higher class, and that Paul "shows traits of vanity". He also talks about how difficult it is for the reader to feel bad for Paul because of how he acts in the story. When actually looking back and seeing how much Paul was struggling it's much easier to sympathize with him. Paul is clearly both unaware and unable to control the way he acts and feels. Examples Rob Sarri uses to support his claim include: Paul not caring about school and being more focused on his job, Paul stealing money from his employer to go away and live out his dream, and Paul killing himself in the end rather than confronting his reality.

David A. Carpenter, describes how Willa Cather was just starting to enjoy city life, which could be the reason "Paul's Case" and "A Wagner Matinee" were so heavily focused on cities like New York and Boston. He states "They also come when Cather is still extolling the big-city cultural life before she learned to love the bleaker environment and warmer people of the American Midwest that she later wrote about in short works and novels that made her famous". In addition, Cather made alterations to the title, paragraph simplification, punctuation and dictation based around her state of life and surroundings 15 years after publication. Similar alterations were made to her other works, such as "A Lost Lady" and "The Professor's House".

== Adaptations ==
- Paul's Case was adapted for television in 1980 as an episode of PBS's The American Short Story anthology series. The 54 minute presentation was directed by Lamont Johnson and starred Eric Roberts.
- Paul's Case was also released as a book-on-tape by HarperCollins in 1981.
- In 1986, Paul's Case was released as an audiobook by Caedmon Audio Cassette
- The story was the basis for a chamber opera in two acts with music by Gregory Spears to a libretto by Spears and Kathryn Walat. It premiered in April 2013 at the Artisphere in Washington, D.C., and was then performed for the PROTOTYPE opera festival in New York City, performed at HERE, 145 6th Avenue.

== See also ==
- 1905 in literature
