= Scandal (short story) =

1919 short story by Willa Cather

- Short story by Willa Cather
- Country: United States
- Language: English
- Genre: Short story

Publication
- Published in: Century
- Publication type: Illustrated monthly magazine
- Publication date: August 1919

"Scandal" is a short story by Willa Cather. It was first published in Century in August 1919.

== Plot summary ==
Kitty Ayrshire, an opera singer, has a cold, thus preventing her from singing. Bored, she asks her friend Pierce Tevis to visit her. Together they talk about the gossip that has been circulating about her. Tevis explains that Siegmund Stein, a wealthy manufacturer, has been going out about town with a woman who resembles Kitty; everyone thinks it is her. Kitty then interrupts him and recounts how while at a party at the Steins's, she had to use her lover Peppo to excuse her from her persistent hosts. A few weeks later however, her picture with both Siegmund Stein and his new wife was in the papers.

== Characters ==
- Kitty Ayrshire, an opera singer.
- Miles Creedon, a doctor.
- Pierce Tevis, a friend of Ayrshire's.
- Lucien Simon, a painter.
- Marcel Durand, a physicist.
- Siegmund Stein, a department-store millionaire. A Jewish-Austrian immigrant, he worked his way up.
- Dan Leland
- Ruby Mohr, an Italian factory worker who looks like Kitty Ayrshire.
- Miss Mandelbaum, Stein's wife.
- Peppo Amoretti, Kitty's Italian lover.

== Allusions to other works ==
Kitty Ayrshire also appears in A Gold Slipper.

== Literary criticism and significance ==
Although Scandal was written in 1916 while she was in Denver, it was only published in 1919. It has been argued that this is due to its antisemitism.

The story was a favorite of F. Scott Fitzgerald.
