= A Wagner Matinee =

1904 short story by Willa Cather

- Short story by Willa Cather

Text available at Wikisource
- Country: United States
- Language: English
- Genre: Short story

Publication
- Published in: Everybody's Magazine
- Publication type: Magazine
- Publication date: February 1904

"A Wagner Matinee" is a short story by Willa Cather. It was first published in Everybody's Magazine in February 1904. In 1906, it appeared in Cather's first published collection of short stories, The Troll Garden.

== Plot summary ==
A young Bostonian named Clark receives word that his Aunt Georgiana is coming to visit from Nebraska to settle an estate. As a young woman, Georgiana had been a talented music teacher at the Boston Conservatory until, during a trip to the Green Mountains, she met Howard Carpenter, ten years her junior. They eloped and moved to a homestead in Nebraska.

Thirty years have passed since Georgiana has seen Boston. Clark recalls her kindness to him when, as a boy, he visited Nebraska and she introduced him to Shakespeare, classical mythology, and the music she played on her small parlour organ.

Clark takes his aunt to a symphony concert of music from Richard Wagner's Tannhauser, Tristan und Isolde, and The Flying Dutchman. She is intensely moved by the music and listens with tears running down her face. When the concert ends she says, "I don't want to go, Clark, I don't want to go!"

Clark realizes that she has nothing ahead of her but the grim drudgery of life back on the Nebraskan plains.

== Setting ==
The story takes place in Boston, but Clark, the narrator, describes Nebraska in detail.

== Characters ==
- Clark, the story's narrator, describes himself as having been "a gangling farmer-boy" with "chilblains"
- Georgiana Carpenter, Clark's aunt
- Howard Carpenter, Clark's uncle
- Mrs. Springer, narrator's landlady

== Allusions to other works ==
- Through Aunt Georgiana, allusions made are to William Shakespeare, Carl Maria von Weber's Euryanthe, Richard Wagner's The Flying Dutchman, Tannhauser, Tristan und Isolde, Der Ring des Nibelungen and Siegfried, Wolfgang Amadeus Mozart, Giacomo Meyerbeer, Giuseppe Verdi's Il trovatore.
