= The Diamond Mine =

1916 short story by Willa Cather

- Short story by Willa Cather
- Country: United States
- Language: English
- Genre: Short story

Publication
- Published in: McClure's
- Publication type: Magazine
- Publication date: October 1916

"The Diamond Mine" is a short story by Willa Cather. It was first published in McClure's in October 1916.

== Plot summary ==
Aboard a ship, Cressida Garnet, a soprano, meets a cousin of her late first husband's. She tells him of her love affair with Blasius Bouchalka, a Bohemian violinist who was her second husband. After he had an affair with their maid, Ruzenka, she filed for divorce and never saw him again. She is now set to marry Jerome Brown, a financier.

Later, we learn that Cressida died on the RMS Titanic. Her marriage to Jerome Brown is said to have been an unhappy one, as he constantly demanded more money from her. Similarly, we learn that after her death, her family wrangled over her will, each hoping to cash in on her fortune.

== Characters ==
- Cressida Garnet, an opera singer.
- Jerome Brown, Garnet's fourth husband.
- Miss Julia, Cressida's sister.
- Horace, Cressida's son.
- Mr Miletus Poppas
- Luisa, Cressida's maid.
- Charley Wilton, Cressida's first husband and Horace's father. He was an organist.
- Blasius Bouchalka, a violinist. He becomes Cressida's second husband.
- Ransome McChord
- Caroline, the narrator.
- Mme Bartolas, a Spanish soprano.
- Ruzenka, Bouchalka's maid.
- Buchanan Garnet, Cressida's brother.
- Henry Gilbert, Cressida's lawyer.

== Allusions to other works ==
- Opera music runs through the story, with direct allusions to Puccini, Massenet's Manon, Janáček's Šárka, Schubert's Marche Militaire, and Mozart's Don Giovanni (through 'Donna Anna').

== Literary criticism and significance ==
The story was the last one she published in McClure's. Moreover, it has been noted that Cather initially didn't think the story would suit the format of a magazine due to its length, subject matter and mode of narration.

It has been suggested that The Diamond Mine bears similarities with The Song of the Lark, insofar as both writings deal with a female artist's relationship with her family.
