= A Death in the Desert =

1903 short story by Willa Cather

- Short story by Willa Cather

Text available at Wikisource
- Country: United States
- Language: English
- Genre: Short story

Publication
- Published in: Scribner's Magazine
- Publication type: Magazine
- Publication date: January 1903

"A Death in the Desert" is a short story by Willa Cather. It was first published in The Scribner's in January 1903.

== Plot summary ==
Everett is on a train from Holdrege, Nebraska to Cheyenne, Wyoming. He is a man that looks like his older prodigy brother Adriance—this similarity haunts him throughout the entire story and robs him of his own personality. He will always be Adriance's brother.

The story follows Everett Hilgarde as he visits Katherine Gaylord, a dying woman who was once in love with his famous brother Adriance who was a musician and composer. Through Everett’s encounter with Katherine, he is forced to confront the emotional and psychological weight of living in his brother’s shadow. The desert makes the characters feel more alone and thoughtful as they confront death and the memories that still haunt them.

== Characters ==
- Everett Hilgarde
- Charley Gaylord
- Two girls on the train.
- Adriance Hilgarde
- Katharine Gaylord
- Maggie Gaylord
- The Parson

== Allusions to other works ==
- Katharine Gaylord mentions Richard Wagner's Das Rheingold, Edward Gibbon's The History of the Decline and Fall of the Roman Empire, and Heinrich Heine's Florentine Nights.

Moreover, Gussie Davis' song "In the Baggage Coach Ahead" is mentioned - albeit 'in' is elided.

== Literary significance and criticism ==
It has been argued that the title of the story was influenced by Willa Cather's reading of Robert Browning.

Allusions to Alexandre Dumas, fils' La dame aux camelias and Lucretius's De rerum natura have also been found.
