= The Sculptor's Funeral =

1905 short story by Willa Cather

- Short story by Willa Cather

Text available at Wikisource
- Country: United States
- Language: English
- Genre: Short story

Publication
- Published in: McClure's
- Publication type: Magazine
- Publication date: January 1905

"The Sculptor's Funeral" is a short story by Willa Cather. It was first published in McClure's in January 1905.

== Plot summary ==
In the fictional small town of Sand City, Kansas, the body of Harvey Merrick, a famed sculptor, is brought back to his parents' house. Only Jim Laird, Harvey's old friend, and Henry Steavens, his student, have any real emotion. While the mother cries out in exaggerated and insincere grief, Steavens and Laird talk, and we learn that Laird never made it out of the town. Later, the mother, showing her cruelty, yells at her maid for forgetting to do the salad dressing. As the men sit by the body, they moralize and criticize the deceased. This angers Laird, who comes into the room and points out how each of them are guilty, before exposing the corruption of their town's leaders and how much they had hated Harvey. The next day, Laird, who is disgusted with himself for never having found a life elsewhere as Harvey had done, is too drunk to attend the funeral. The story ends with the notation that Laird dies of a cold shortly thereafter.

== Characters ==
- A group of townspeople
- Mr Harvey Merrick, a late sculptor with a 'lady-like voice'. He went to college in Boston.
- Annie, Harvey's mother.
- Martin, Harvey's father.
- Roxy, the mulatto maid in the Merricks' household.
- Jim Laird, the red-bearded lawyer.
- Philip Phelps, the banker.
- Elder, another banker.
- Thompson, the undertaker.
- Henry Steavens, a student of Harvey's.

== Literary significance and criticism ==
It has been argued that the short story was foreshadowed by Willa Cather's poem "The Night Express." Harvey's prototype was the Pittsburgh-born artist Charles Stanley Reinhart. Cather wrote a feature story about the first anniversary of the death of Reinhart in 1897, when a monument was raised in Allegheny Cemetery in Pittsburgh.
