= Dumb Dicks =

1932 film

- Directed by: Ralph Ceder
- Written by: Ewart Adamson
- Starring: Benny Rubin
- Cinematography: Harry Jackson
- Edited by: John Link
- Distributed by: RKO Radio Pictures
- Release date: March 21, 1932
- Running time: 19 minutes
- Country: United States
- Language: English

Dumb Dicks is a 1932 American Pre-Code short comedy film directed by Ralph Ceder and starring Benny Rubin. It was written by Ewart Adamson.

== Plot summary ==
Two incompetent private detectives pose as swamis in order to infiltrate a gang of bank robbers. dumb dicks

== Cast ==
- Benny Rubin as Detective Rubin
- Harry Gribbon as Harry
- Heinie Conklin as Danny
- Eddie Boland as Squirt
- Bud Fine as Lugs
- Arthur Thalasso as Drinkies
- Billy Franey as janitor
- Ivan Linow as Jainz
