= The Human Gamble =

1916 movie directed by Lloyd Carleton

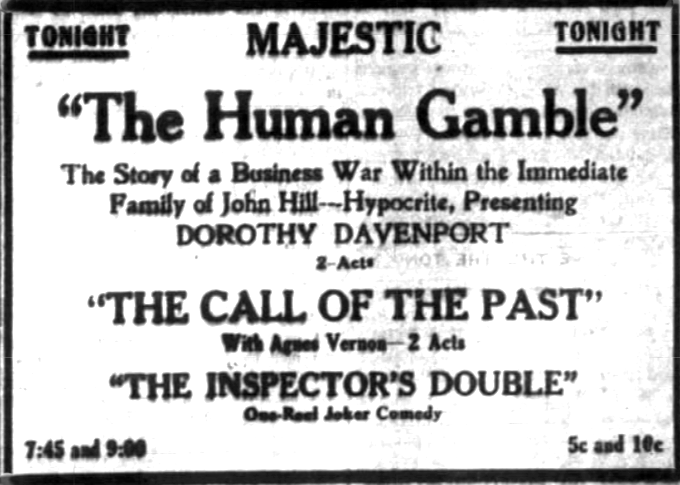
- 1916 Newspaper advertisement
- Directed by: Lloyd B. Carleton
- Written by: Calder Johnstone
- Screenplay by: Calder Johnstone
- Produced by: Lloyd B. Carleton
- Starring: Dorothy Davenport; Emory Johnson
- Production company: Rex
- Distributed by: Universal
- Release date: October 8, 1916
- Running time: 15–24 minutes (2 reels)
- Country: United States
- Language: Silent (English intertitles)

The Human Gamble was a 1916 American silent short film directed by Lloyd B. Carleton. The film is based on the story and screen adaptation by Calder Johnstone. The drama stars Dorothy Davenport, Emory Johnson, and a cast of Universal contract players.

The story revolves around a stockbroker Father and his two children. Both work at the father's firm, but the son gets fired for gambling. His sister follows him out the door. They both go to work for a rival firm. Financial adventures ensue, and the daughter ends up saving her father's brokerage house from financial ruin.

Universal released the film on October 8, 1916.

== Plot ==
John Hill is a successful wall-street stock trader and runs his own brokerage house. Hill has achieved his success through prudent investments and hard work. He hoped to instill these qualities in his children. He has a son, Charles, and a daughter, Flavia. Both of his children work at the Hill brokerage house. Charles Hill, along with being a stockbroker, also loves to gamble. While spending a considerable amount of time at the gaming tables, he has racked up debts. His father has helped him repay a few of these debts. John Hill believes his son's gambling habit sends the wrong message to potential investment clients. His gambling habits also jeopardized his ascent to the president of the brokerage house.

Since John Hill despises anyone identified with gambling, his resentment of his son's gambling grows until his emotions boil. He demands his son to move out of the house and then disowns him. Flavia must choose between supporting her brother or her father. She supports her brother, and they both move away while resigning their positions at their father's company.

Time passes, both siblings find employment at a rival brokerage company. They become confidential clerks for the brokerage house owner, Frank Garner. Both become successful at their new positions. Flavia moves up the ranks and becomes the company's office supervisor. Flavia's beauty and acumen with stocks catch Frank's eye. Frank and Flavia grow closer and develop feelings for each other. They set a date, and the couple marries. They share ownership of the Brokerage house.

A financial war breaks out between the two brokerage houses. Amid this rivalry, Frank Garner becomes very ill. Flavia takes charge of the brokerage house. It is up to Flavia to sustain the competition against her father. Flavia brings the Garner house to new financial heights while pushing her father to the brink of total collapse.

Her father calls Flavia and pleads with her to help him. The rivalry has reached a point where she must decide between an obligation to her father and her husband's love. At first, she refuses to help her father since she has a point to prove. Also, if she helps her father, it will ruin her husband's business.

Flavia reconsiders and decides Blood is thicker than water. She scrambles to her father's office and finds him about to commit suicide. Flavia develops a quick financial recovery plan for her father. She engineers a financial bailout of her father's company reaps a windfall profit and saves her father's brokerage house. Her father regains his financial footing and repays the debt to his daughter. They settled all financial obligations between the two rival companies. The Hill family reconciles while saving her father's company, and they all live happy lives.

== Cast ==
Actor	Role
Dorothy Davenport	Flavia Hill
Emory Johnson	Charles Hill
Richard Morris	Frank Garner
Alfred Allen	John Hill

== Production ==
=== Pre production ===
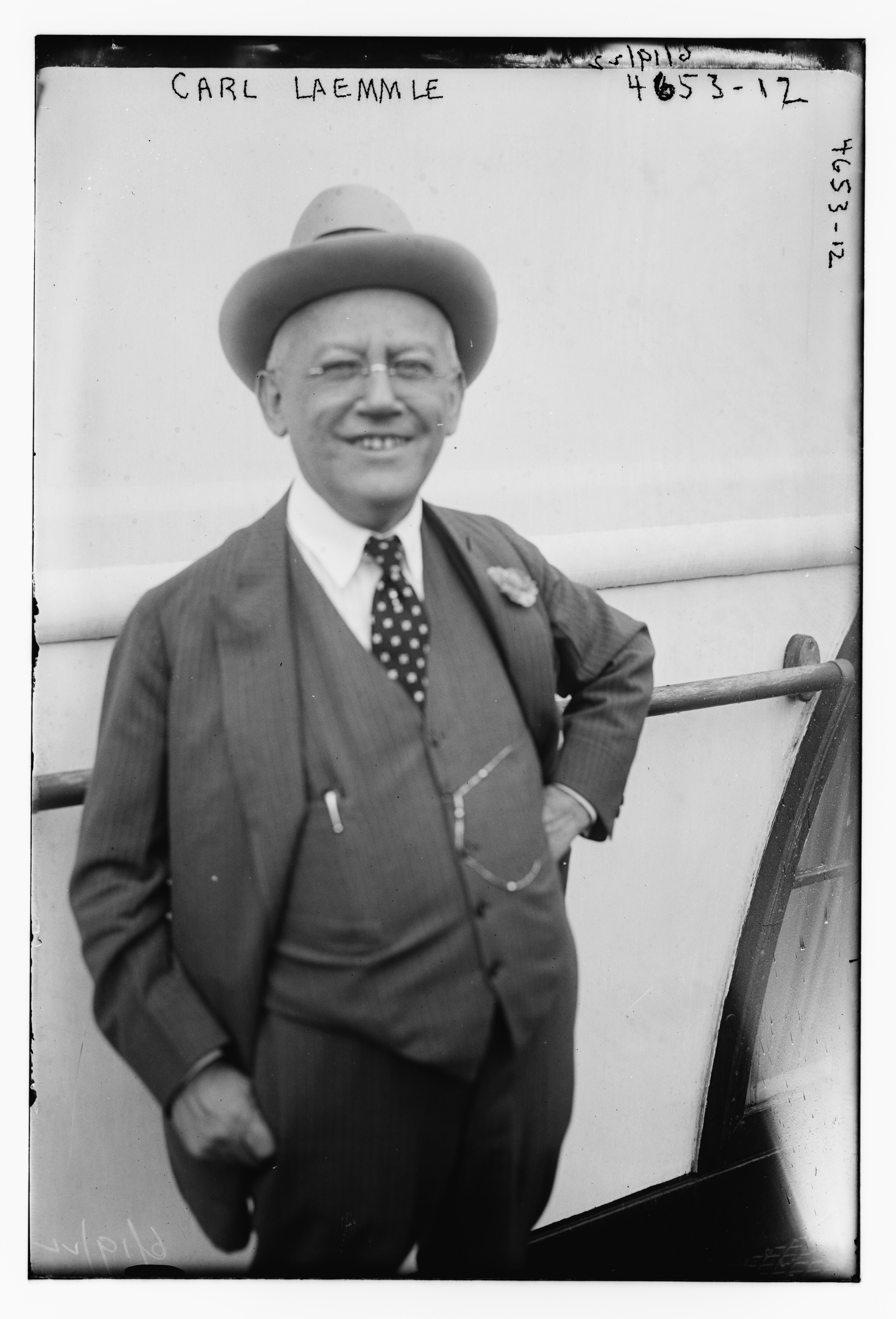
Carl Laemmle in 1918

Universal Logo 1915

In the book, "American Cinema's Transitional Era," the authors point out, The years between 1908 and 1917 witnessed what may have been the most significant transformation in American film history. During this "transitional era," widespread changes affected film form and film genres, filmmaking practices and industry structure, exhibition sites, and audience demographics. One aspect of this transition was the longer duration of films. Feature films (Note: A "feature film" or "feature-length film" is a narrative film (motion picture or "movie") with a running time long enough to be considered the principal or sole presentation in a commercial entertainment program. A film can be distributed as a feature film if it equals or exceeds a specified minimum running time and satisfies other defined criteria. The minimum time depends on the governing agency. The American Film Institute and the British Film Institute require films to have a minimum running time of forty minutes or longer. Other film agencies, e.g.,Screen Actors Guild, require a film's running time to be 60 minutes or greater. Currently, most feature films are between 70 and 210 minutes long.) were slowly becoming the standard fare for Hollywood producers. Before 1913, you could count the yearly features on two hands. Between 1915 and 1916, the number of feature movies rose 2 ½ times or from 342 films to 835. There was a recurring claim that Carl Laemmle was the longest-running studio chief resisting the production of feature films. Universal was not ready to downsize its short film business because short films were cheaper, faster, and more profitable to produce than feature films. (Note: " Short Film" - There are no defined parameters for a Short film except for one immutable rule -the film's maximum running time. The Academy of Motion Picture Arts and Sciences defines a short film as "an original motion picture that has a running time of 40 minutes or less, including all credits".)

Laemmle would continue to buck this trend while slowly increasing his output of features. In 1914, Laemmle published an essay titled - Doom of long Features Predicted. In 1915, Laemmle ran an advertisement extolling Bluebird films while adding the following vocabulary on the top of the ad. (Note: The moving picture business is here to stay. That you must admit, despite carping critics and blundering sore-heads, true, some exhibitors have found business so good lately — but if you get down to facts when you look for a reason why, it's a 100 to 1 shot that they are, and for some time have been, dallying with a feature program. Some of these wise ones will tell you that business has picked up since they went into features, — BUT — ask them whether they are talking NET or GROSS. They will find they have an immediate appointment and terminate your queries unceremoniously. Funny how we like to kid ourselves, isn't it? The man who is packing 'em in and losing money on features is envied by his competitor, who is laying by a bit every day, and has a good steady, dependable patronage but admits to a few vacant seats at some performances. When this chap wakes up, he will realize that he has a gold mine and that good advertising will make it produce to capacity. The moral is that if you can tie up to the Universal Program, DO IT. If you can't NOW, watch your first chance. Let the people know what you have, and let the feature man go on to ruin if he wants to. You should worry! Motion Picture News - May 6, 1916) Carl Laemmle released 100 feature-length films in 1916, as stated in Clive Hirschhorn's book, The Universal Story.

==== Casting ====
All players in this film were under contract with Universal.

- Dorothy Davenport (1895-1977) was an established star for Universal when the 21 year-old actress played Flavia Hill. She had acted in hundreds of movies by the time she starred in this film. Most of these films were 2-reel shorts, as was the norm in Hollywood's teen years. She had been making movies since 1910. She started dating Wally Reid when she was barely 16, and he was 20. They married in 1913. After her husband died in 1923, she used the name "Mrs. Wallace Reid" in the credits for any project she took part in. Besides being an actress, she would eventually become a film director, producer, and writer.
- Emory Johnson (1894-1960) was 22 years old when he starred in this movie as Charles Hill. Carl Laemmle of Universal Film Manufacturing Company thought he saw great potential in Johnson, so he chose him to be Universal's new leading man. Laemmle's hope was Johnson would become another Wallace Reed. A major part of his plan was to create a movie couple that would sizzle on the silver screen. Laemmle thought Dorothy Davenport and Emory Johnson could create the chemistry he sought. Johnson and Davenport would complete 13 films together. They started with the successful feature production of Doctor Neighbor in May 1916 and ended with The Devil's Bondwoman in November 1916. After completing the last movie, Laemmle thought Johnson did not have the screen presence he wanted. He decided not to renew his contract. Johnson would make 17 movies in 1916, including 6 shorts and 11 feature-length Dramas. 1916 would become the second-highest movie output of his entire acting career. Emory acted in 25 films for Universal, mostly dramas with a sprinkling of comedies and westerns.
- Richard Morris (1862-1924) was 54 years old when he played Frank Garner. He was a character actor and former opera singer known for Granny (1913). He would eventually participate in many Johnson projects, including |In the Name of the Law (1922), The Third Alarm (1922), The West~Bound Limited (1923), The Mailman (1923) until his untimely death in 1924.
- Alfred Allen (1866-1947) was 50 years old when he played John Hill. Allen was highly educated, had a commanding presence, stood six feet tall, and weighed two hundred pounds. He got his start in the film industry at Universal city in 1913. He landed his first role in 1915. His roles were character parts, and he played mostly fathers, villains, or ranch owners. Alfred Allen appeared in 69 features from 1916 through 1929. After Heartaches he would appear in four more Davenport-Johnson projects: A Yoke of Gold, The Unattainable, The Human Gamble and Barriers of Society.

==== Director ====
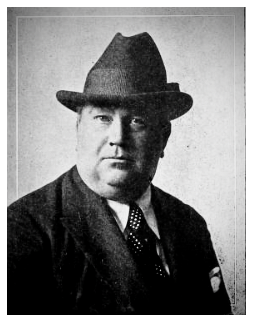
Director Lloyd B. Carleton

Lloyd B. Carleton (c. 1872–1933) started working for Carl Laemmle in the Fall of 1915. Carleton arrived with impeccable credentials, having directed some 60 films for the likes of Thanhouser, Lubin, Fox, and Selig.

Between March and December 1916, 44-year-old Lloyd Carleton directed 16 movies for Universal, starting with The Yaqui and ending with The Morals of Hilda released on December 11, 1916. Emory Johnson acted in all 16 of these films. Of Carleton's total 1916 output, 11 were feature films, and the rest were two-reel shorts. After Emory Johnson signed his Universal contract in early 1916, Carl Laemmle, the owner of Universal Pictures, thought he had found a new leading man. Laemmle was looking for a male lead like Wallace Reid. He also wanted to develop a cinematic pair that would captivate audiences.

Johnson became Laemmle's choice for his new leading man. Laemmle chose Dorothy Davenport to spark screen chemistry with Johnson. She was a Universal contract player who was Wallace Reid's wife. Universal's top director, Lloyd B. Carleton, was tasked by Laemmle to direct all of this pair's films.

The collaboration of Johnson and Davenport resulted in 13 films, beginning with the release of Doctor Neighbor in May 1916. The last film in the series was The Devil's Bondwoman, released in November 1916. The majority of the movies were feature films. All the films featured Johnson and Davenport as the main stars.

Davenport became pregnant in October 1916, and her film output dropped sharply in early 1917. In the end, Laemmle felt Johnson was not talented nor charismatic enough. He would not be Universal's version of Wally Reid. Laemmle felt that the films needed more screen chemistry, even if they made money. In June 1918, Universal failed to renew the contract of Emory Johnson.

The table below lists the 13 films Johnson and Davenport collaborated on.

◆ Films starring Emory Johnson and Dorothy Davenport in 1916 ◆
Title	Released	Director	Davenport role	Johnson role	Type	Time	LOC	Brand	Notes
Doctor Neighbor	1 May	Carleton	Hazel Rogers	Hamilton Powers	Drama	Feature	lost	Red Feather	
Her Husband's Faith	11 May	Carleton	Mabel Otto	Richard Otto	Drama	Short	lost	Universal	
Heartaches	18 May	Carleton	Virginia Payne	S Jackson Hunt	Drama	Short	lost	Universal	
Two Mothers	1 Jun	Carleton	Violetta Andree	2nd Husband	Drama	Short	lost	Universal	
Her Soul's Song	15 Jun	Carleton	Mary Salsbury	Paul Chandos	Drama	Short	lost	Universal	
The Way of the World	3 Jul	Carleton	Beatrice Farley	Walter Croyden	Drama	Feature	lost	Red Feather	
No. 16 Martin Street	13 Jul	Carleton	Cleo	Jacques Fournier	Drama	Short	lost	Universal	
A Yoke of Gold	14 Aug	Carleton	Carmen	Jose Garcia	Drama	Feature	lost	Red Feather	
The Unattainable	4 Sep	Carleton	Bessie Gale	Robert Goodman	Drama	Feature	1 of 5 reels	Bluebird	
Black Friday	18 Sep	Carleton	Elionor Rossitor	Charles Dalton	Drama	Feature	lost	Red Feather	
The Human Gamble	8 Oct	Carleton	Flavia Hill	Charles Hill	Drama	Short	lost	Universal	
Barriers of Society	10 Oct	Carleton	Martha Gorham	Westie Phillips	Drama	Feature	1 of 5 reels	Red Feather	
The Devil's Bondwoman	11 Nov	Carleton	Beverly Hope	Mason Van Horton	Drama	Feature	lost	Red Feather	

==== Screenplay ====
Calder Johnstone (1880–1958) wrote both the story and screen adaptation.

=== Filming ===
On March 15, 1915, Laemmle opened the world's largest motion picture production facility, Universal City Studios. Since this film required no location shooting, it was filmed in its entirety at the new studio complex.

The Davenport-Johnson pairing produced 13 films which over half were feature-length. Before The Human Gamble, the pairing had headlined five feature-length films, including: Doctor Neighbor, The Way of the World, A Yoke of Gold, The Unattainable, and Black Friday.

According to an article in November 1, 1916 issue of The York Gazette:

"Lloyd Carleton, Dorothy Davenport, and Emory Johnson make their appearance on the Universal program in a two-reel, after a protracted period of stardom in Red Feather and Bluebird features. The Human Gamble was initially intended to be a five-reel picture, but after the production was well underway, it was discovered that it would be much better as a short-reel picture."

== Release and reception ==
=== Official release ===
The copyright was filed with U.S. Copyright Office on September 21, 1916. and entered into the record as shown: (Note: The copyright was filed with U.S. Copyright Office and entered into the record as shown: THE HUMAN GAMBLE. Rex. 1916. 2 reels. Credits: Calder Johnstone; Producer, Lloyd B. Carleton. © Universal Film Mfg. Co., Inc.; 21Sep16; LP9161) and officially released on October 8, 1916.

=== Advertising ===
By 1915, feature films were becoming more the trend in Hollywood. However, Universal wasn't ready to downsize its short film business. Short films were cheaper and faster to produce than feature films. While advertising short films, Universal might include a section titled–"' The Universal Programs'" above the movie ads, espousing the advantages of continuing to show short films. (Note: "The moving picture business is here to stay. Some of these wise ones will tell you that business has picked up since they went into features, — BUT — ask them whether they are talking NET or GROSS. The man who is packing 'em in and losing money on features is envied by his competitor, who is laying by a bit every day, and has a good steady, dependable patronage but admits to a few vacant seats at some performances. When this chap wakes up, he will realize that he has a gold mine and that good advertising will make it produce to capacity. The moral is that if you can tie up to the Universal Program, DO IT. If you can't NOW, watch your first chance. Let the people know what you have and let the feature man go on to ruin if he wants to.")

Many of the newspaper ads for the film use the following Tagline:

"A Financial Drama, Wall Street, or The Card Room, is There any real Difference?"

Other newspaper ads use the following hook to attract paying customers:

"Story of a business war waged within the immediate family of John Hill. - Hypocrite"

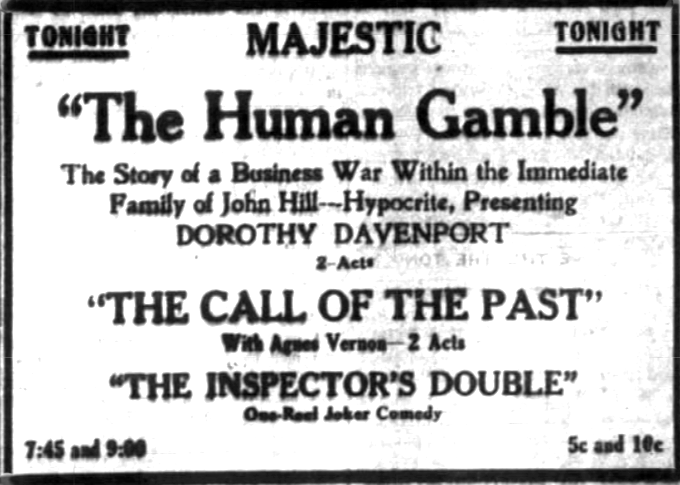
Newspaper advertisement from the Portage Daily Register, 1916

One newspaper advertisement shows The Human Gamble playing along with two other films:

- William Lowery and Agnes Vernon starring the two-reel drama The Call of the Past.
- Gale Henry and Billy Franey starring the one-reel comedy The Inspector's Double.

=== Reviews ===
Lengthy detailed reviews for short films were rare. The Hollywood magazines primarily reviewed feature films and only gave short films honorable mention. Of course, in 1916, movie magazines were evolving and becoming more sophisticated like the movies they reviewed and advertised.

In the October 14, 1916 issue of The Moving Picture World, quoted from the section - Comments on the Films - Exclusively by our own Staff:

"This is a bright, entertaining subject, well-constructed and quite original in certain situations."

The November 1, 1916 issue of The York Gazette & Daily, the reviewer points out:

"The picture, being a Carleton production, is full to the brim of exciting moments and tense situations."

== Preservation status ==
Many silent-era films did not survive for reasons as explained on this Wikipedia page. (Note: Film is history. With every foot of film lost, we lose a link to our culture, the world around us, each other, and ourselves. – Martin Scorsese, filmmaker, director NFPF Board A report by Library of Congress film historian and archivist David Pierce estimates that: around 75% of original silent-era films have perished; 14% of the 10,919 silent films released by major studios exist in their original 35 mm or other formats; 11% survive only in full-length foreign versions or film formats of lesser image quality.)

According to the Library of Congress, all known copies of this film are lost.

== Gallery ==
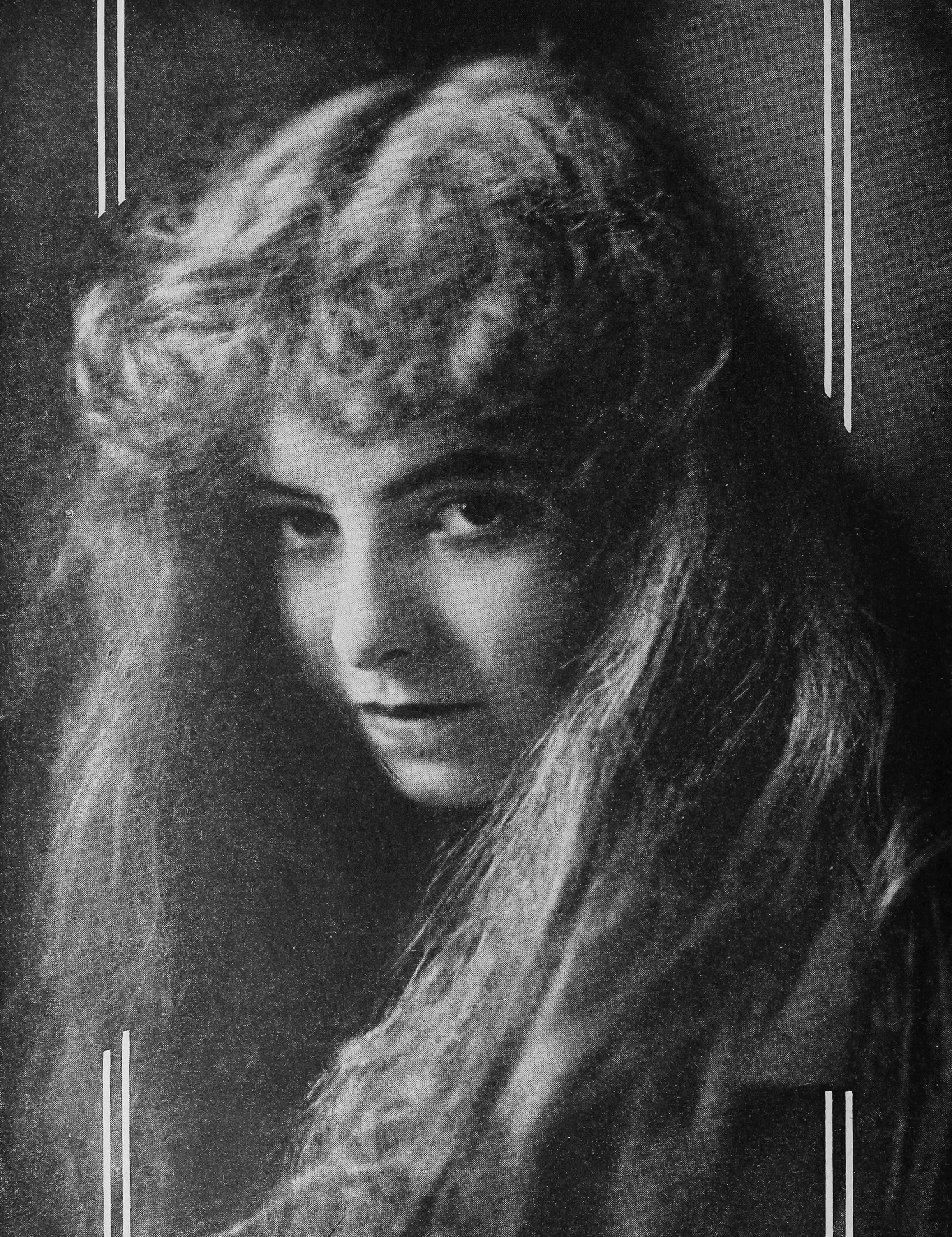
Dorothy Davenport in 1914
Flavia Hill

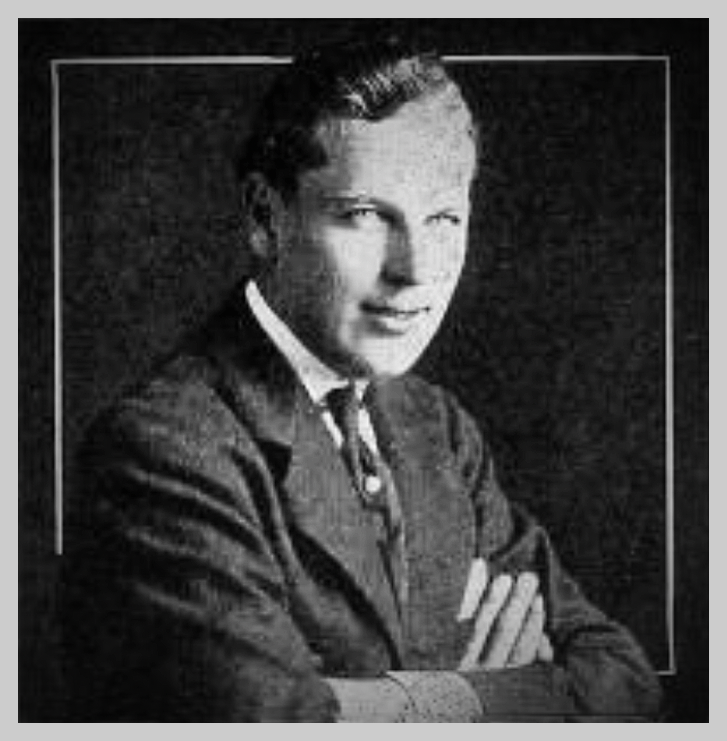
Emory Johnson in 1916
Charles Hill

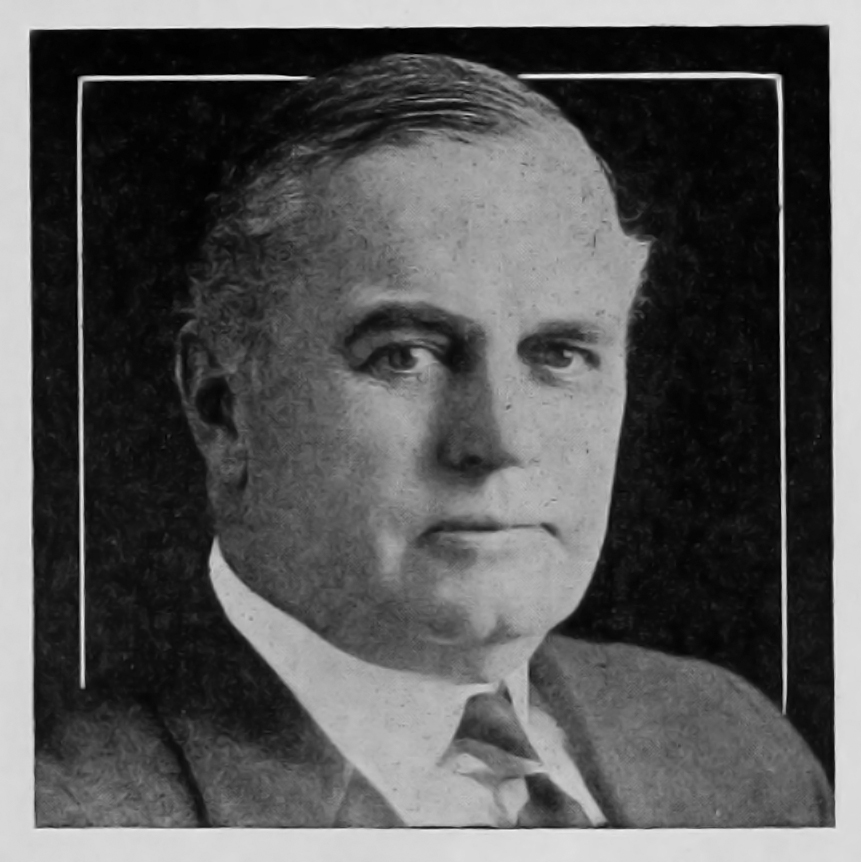
Richard Morris in 1916
Frank Garner

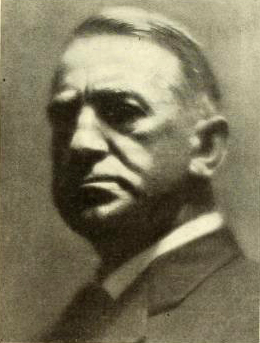
Alfred Allen in 1919
John Hill

== Sources ==
- Braff, R.E. (1999). The Universal Silents: A Filmography of the Universal Motion Picture Manufacturing Company, 1912-1929. McFarland. ISBN 978-0-7864-0287-8.
- Hirschhorn, Clive (1983). The Universal Story - The Complete History of the Studio and its 2,641 films. New York: Crown Publishing Group. pp. 22–23. ISBN 0-517-55001-6.
- Keil, C.; Stamp, S. (2004). American Cinema's Transitional Era: Audiences, Institutions, Practices. ACLS Humanities E-Book. University of California Press. ISBN 978-0-520-24027-8.
