= Barriers of Society =

1916 American silent drama film

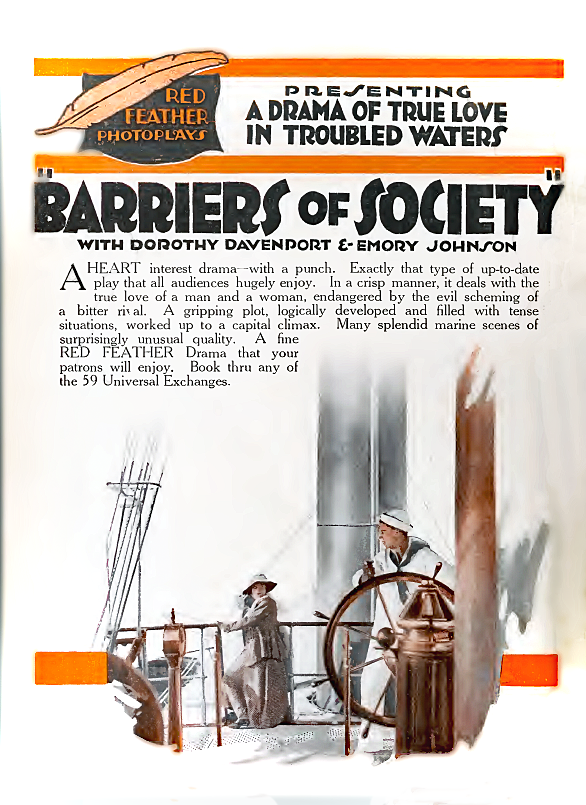
- Newspaper advertisement for the film
- Directed by: Lloyd B. Carleton
- Screenplay by: Fred Myton
- Story by: Clarke Irvine
- Produced by: Universal Red Feather
- Starring: Dorothy Davenport; Emory Johnson
- Cinematography: Roy H. Klaffki
- Distributed by: Universal Film Manufacturing Company
- Release date: October 16, 1916
- Running time: 50–75 minutes (5 reels)
- Country: United States
- Language: English intertitles

Barriers of Society is a 1916 American silent romantic drama film directed by Lloyd B. Carleton. Universal based the film on the story written by Clarke Irvine and adapted for the screen by Fred Myton. Dorothy Davenport and Emory Johnson, lead an all-star cast of Universal contract players in this feature film.

The film begins with the rescue of a wealthy girl stranded on a small island by the son of a modest fish seller. Saving her ignites his feelings of affection. Her status prevents her from even considering such thoughts.

Years later, fate reunites them. They find themselves aboard a yacht; she is the owner's guest, while he is a crew member. Unknown to them, the yacht's owner has hatched a scheme to win the woman's affection. He intends to create a fake emergency, forcing them to abandon the ship to a nearby uncharted island. The owner hopes that while stranded on the isle, they will fall in love with each other. After he is confident of her love, the owner will signal for a nearby rescue ship.

The plot turns unexpectedly when the owner, girl, and fisherman's son get shipwrecked on the island. Not surprisingly, we discover that the two men have the same love interest. Many twists and turns finally lead to the society girl and fisherman's son discovering their love for each other. Despite many obstacles, fate brought them together, and in the end, they overcame the Barriers of Society.

Universal Film Manufacturing Company released the film on October 16, 1916.

== Plot ==
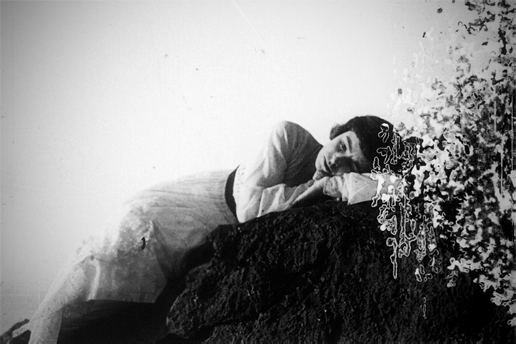
Martha Gorham trapped on a rock

Westie Phillips is the son of a poor commercial trawler and his wife. One day while paddling his canoe around the ocean, he finds a pretty girl marooned on a rock. Since the tide is rising, he rescues her and takes her to safety. The young girl turns out to be Martha Gorman, the daughter of the wealthy Silas Gorman. In that instant, Westie falls in love. Martha thanks him and forgets him.

Harry Arnold is a prosperous man, much older than Martha. Harry is also a man in love. He constantly flirts with Martha, hoping to win her hand in marriage. Despite Arnold's persistent entreaties, Martha rebuffs them all. Martha's father, Silas Gorman, is not against such a wedding but will not render an opinion. Silas wants his daughter to make her own marriage choices.

The time occurs for every young man to seek their fortune when they must go out in the world. That day arrives for Westie, and he leaves home to set out in the world. Westie gets shanghaied while seeking employment. He wakes up aboard a ship headed to the Orient. They victimized Westie like most sailors, forceable impressed into service aboard a ship. Somehow, Westie jumps ship and escapes to Honolulu.

Harry Arnold has worked out an insidious plot to win Martha's hand in marriage. First, Arnold invites Martha and her father to go on a cruise aboard his yacht. The thought of partying aboard a ship appeals to both of them, and they accept Arnold's invitation. Once at sea, one of the yacht's crewmen becomes troublesome. Arnold forces the captain to head to port and put him ashore. Once in port, they seek a replacement. They hire a hungry Westie Phillips to replace the sailor. Westie comes on board and recognizes Martha. She does not know who Westie is since the rescue was long ago and long forgotten. After he assumes his duties, he sees Martha repulse lecherous Arnold's advances.

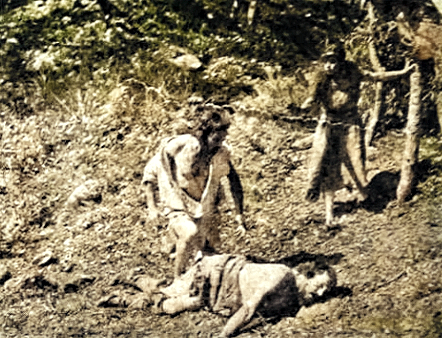
Westie kills Arnold to save Martha

Now is the time for Harry Arnold to start the next phase of his plan. Arnold will have the captain of his yacht stage a fake shipwreck near an uncharted island. The crew and partygoers will jump into lifeboats. Arnold will have one lifeboat set in the water with only Martha and himself on board. They will head to the remote island. Arnold feels that by force or otherwise, he can persuade Martha to love and marry him. After a month, the yacht's captain will return and rescue them.

Events unfold, and Westie senses Martha is in peril. Westie catches wind of Arnold's plan. He scrambles to Arnold's lifeboat and asks to go with them. At that exact moment, the captain hits him in the back of the head, knocking him out. Arnold and Martha row their dinghy towards the island. Westie gains his senses and realizes the boat is long gone. He swims to an empty lifeboat and starts paddling toward shore. He hears a woman scream.

After Westie reaches the beach, he discovers Arnold is trying to force himself on Martha. He saves her, and Arnold agrees to behave. Two alpha males and beautiful women agree to make a go of it while awaiting rescue. Arnold is driving himself into a rage after his plan goes awry. He pulls Westie aside and offers him a fortune if he moves to the other side of the island. Westie will not abandon the woman of his dreams. Arnold is beside himself. Later in the evening, Arnold decides if he can't have Martha, then no one will. He tries to murder her. Once again, Westie comes to her relief. An epic battle occurs, and Westie kills Arnold.

Time passes, a rescue ship appears, and the couple flag the ship down. Before their rescue ship arrives, they glance at each other and realize they are in love.

== Cast ==
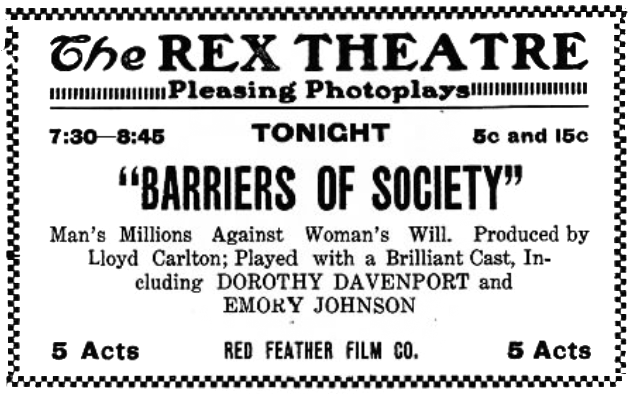
Actor	Role
Dorothy Davenport	Martha Gorham
Emory Johnson	Westie Phillips
Frederick Montague	Silas Gorham
Alfred Allen	John Phillips
Richard Morris	Harry Arnold
Miss Whiting	Mary Phillips

== Production ==
=== Pre-production ===
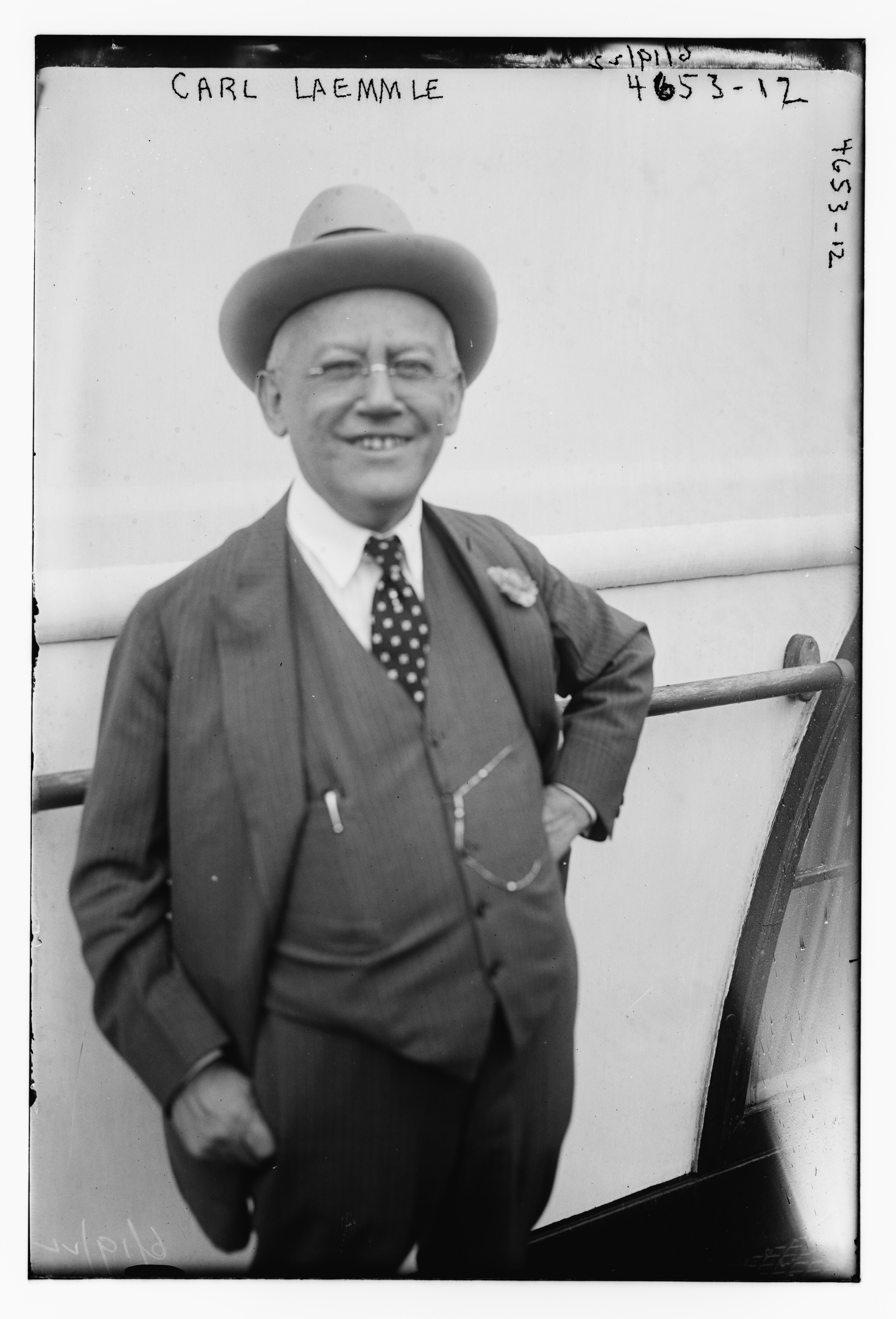
Carl Laemmle in 1918

Universal Logo 1915

In the book, "American Cinema's Transitional Era," the authors point out, The years between 1908 and 1917 witnessed what may have been the most significant transformation in American film history. During this "transitional era", widespread changes affected film form and film genres, filmmaking practices and industry structure, exhibition sites, and audience demographics. One aspect of this transition was the longer duration of films. Feature films (Note: A "feature film" or "feature-length film" is a narrative film (motion picture or "movie") with a running time long enough to be considered the principal or sole presentation in a commercial entertainment program. A film can be distributed as a feature film if it equals or exceeds a specified minimum running time and satisfies other defined criteria. The minimum time depends on the governing agency. The American Film Institute and the British Film Institute require films to have a minimum running time of forty minutes or longer. Other film agencies, e.g.,Screen Actors Guild, require a film's running time to be 60 minutes or greater. Currently, most feature films are between 70 and 210 minutes long.) were slowly becoming the standard fare for Hollywood producers. Before 1913, you could count the yearly features on two hands. Between 1915 and 1916, the number of feature movies rose two-and-a-half times, from 342 films to 835. There was a recurring claim that Carl Laemmle was the longest-running studio chief resisting the production of feature films. Universal was not ready to downsize its short film business because short films were cheaper, faster, and more profitable to produce than feature films. (Note: " Short Film" - There are no defined parameters for a Short film except for one immutable rule -the film's maximum running time. The Academy of Motion Picture Arts and Sciences defines a short film as "an original motion picture that has a running time of 40 minutes or less, including all credits".)

Laemmle would continue to buck this trend while slowly increasing his output of features. In 1914, Laemmle published an essay titled - Doom of long Features Predicted. In 1916, Laemmle ran an advertisement extolling Bluebird films while adding the following vocabulary on the top of the ad. (Note: The moving picture business is here to stay. That you must admit, despite carping critics and blundering sore-heads, true, some exhibitors have found business so good lately — but if you get down to facts when you look for a reason why, it's a 100 to 1 shot that they are, and for some time have been, dallying with a feature program. Some of these wise ones will tell you that business has picked up since they went into features, — BUT — ask them whether they are talking NET or GROSS. They will find they have an immediate appointment and terminate your queries unceremoniously. Funny how we like to kid ourselves, isn't it? The man who is packing 'em in and losing money on features is envied by his competitor, who is laying by a bit every day, and has a good steady, dependable patronage but admits to a few vacant seats at some performances. When this chap wakes up, he will realize that he has a gold mine and that good advertising will make it produce to capacity. The moral is that if you can tie up to the Universal Program, DO IT. If you can't NOW, watch your first chance. Let the people know what you have, and let the feature man go on to ruin if he wants to. You should worry! Motion Picture News - May 6, 1916) Universal made 91 feature films in 1916, including 44 Bluebirds and 47 Red Feather productions.

This film was labeled with Universal's Red Feather brand, indicating it was a low-budget feature film.

==== Casting ====
- Dorothy Davenport (1895–1977) was an established star for Universal when the 21 year-old actress played Martha Gorham. She had acted in hundreds of movies by the time she starred in this film. The majority of these films were 2-reel shorts, as was the norm in Hollywood's teen years. She had been making movies since 1910. She started dating Wally Reid when she was barely 16, and he was 20. They married in 1913. After her husband died in 1923, she used the name "Mrs. Wallace Reid" in the credits for any project she took part in. Besides being an actress, she would eventually become a film director, producer, and writer.
- Emory Johnson (1894–1960) was 22 years old when he acted in this movie as Westie Phillips. In January 1916, Emory signed a contract with Universal Film Manufacturing Company. Carl Laemmle of Universal Film Manufacturing Company thought he saw great potential in Johnson, so he chooses him to be Universal's new leading man. Laemmle's hope was Johnson would become another Wallace Reed. A major part of his plan was to create a movie couple that would sizzle on the silver screen. Laemmle thought Dorothy Davenport and Emory Johnson could create the chemistry he sought. Johnson and Davenport would complete 13 films together. They started with the successful feature production of Doctor Neighbor in May 1916 and ended with The Devil's Bondwoman in November 1916. After completing the last movie, Laemmle thought Johnson did not have the screen presence he wanted. He decided not to renew his contract. Johnson would make 17 movies in 1916, including 6 shorts and 11 feature-length Dramas. 1916 would become the second-highest movie output of his entire acting career. Emory acted in 25 films for Universal, mostly dramas with a sprinkling of comedies and westerns.
- Richard Morris (1862–1924) was a 54 year-old actor when he played villainous yacht owner Harry Arnold. He was a character actor and former opera singer known for Granny (1913). He would eventually participate in many Johnson projects, including |In the Name of the Law (1922), The Third Alarm (1922), The West~Bound Limited (1923), The Mailman (1923), The Spirit of the USA (1924) until his untimely death in 1924.
- Frederick (Fred) Montague (c. 1864-1919) was a 52 year-old actor when he played Silas Gorham, the wealthy father of Martha Gorham. He was an English film actor and appeared in 59 films between 1912 and 1919.
- Alfred Allen (1866–1947) was 50 years old when he was selected to play John Phillips. Allen was highly educated, had a commanding presence and stood six feet tall, and weighed two hundred pounds. He got his start in the film industry at Universal city in 1913. He landed his first role in 1915. His roles were character parts, and he played mostly fathers, villains, or ranch owners. Alfred Allen appeared in 69 features from 1916 through 1929. After Heartaches he would appear in four more Davenport-Johnson projects: A Yoke of Gold, The Unattainable, The Human Gamble and Barriers of Society.

==== Director ====
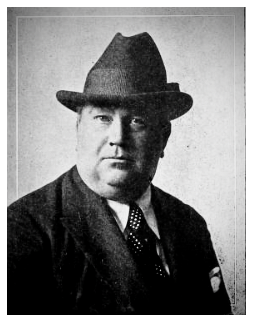
Director Lloyd B. Carleton

Lloyd B. Carleton (c. 1872–1933) started working for Carl Laemmle in the Fall of 1915. Carleton arrived with impeccable credentials, having directed some 60 films for the likes of Thanhouser, Lubin, Fox, and Selig.

Between March and December 1916, 44-year-old Lloyd Carleton directed 16 movies for Universal, starting with The Yaqui and ending with The Morals of Hilda released on December 11, 1916. Emory Johnson acted in all 16 of these films. Of Carleton's total 1916 output, 11 were feature films, and the rest were two-reel shorts. After Emory Johnson signed his Universal contract in early 1916, Carl Laemmle, the owner of Universal Pictures, thought he had found a new leading man. Laemmle was looking for a male lead like Wallace Reid. He also wanted to develop a cinematic pair that would captivate audiences.

Johnson became Laemmle's choice for his new leading man. Laemmle chose Dorothy Davenport to spark screen chemistry with Johnson. She was a Universal contract player who was Wallace Reid's wife. Universal's top director, Lloyd B. Carleton, was tasked by Laemmle to direct all of this pair's films.

The collaboration of Johnson and Davenport resulted in 13 films, beginning with the release of Doctor Neighbor in May 1916. The last film in the series was The Devil's Bondwoman, released in November 1916. The majority of the movies were feature films. All the films featured Johnson and Davenport as the main stars.

Davenport became pregnant in October 1916, and her film output dropped sharply in early 1917. In the end, Laemmle felt Johnson was not talented nor charismatic enough. He would not be Universal's version of Wally Reid. Laemmle felt that the films needed more screen chemistry, even if they made money. In June 1918, Universal failed to renew the contract of Emory Johnson.

The table below lists the 13 films Johnson and Davenport collaborated on.

◆ Films starring Emory Johnson and Dorothy Davenport in 1916 ◆
Title	Released	Director	Davenport role	Johnson role	Type	Time	LOC	Brand	Notes
Doctor Neighbor	1 May	Carleton	Hazel Rogers	Hamilton Powers	Drama	Feature	lost	Red Feather	
Her Husband's Faith	11 May	Carleton	Mabel Otto	Richard Otto	Drama	Short	lost	Universal	
Heartaches	18 May	Carleton	Virginia Payne	S Jackson Hunt	Drama	Short	lost	Universal	
Two Mothers	1 Jun	Carleton	Violetta Andree	2nd Husband	Drama	Short	lost	Universal	
Her Soul's Song	15 Jun	Carleton	Mary Salsbury	Paul Chandos	Drama	Short	lost	Universal	
The Way of the World	3 Jul	Carleton	Beatrice Farley	Walter Croyden	Drama	Feature	lost	Red Feather	
No. 16 Martin Street	13 Jul	Carleton	Cleo	Jacques Fournier	Drama	Short	lost	Universal	
A Yoke of Gold	14 Aug	Carleton	Carmen	Jose Garcia	Drama	Feature	lost	Red Feather	
The Unattainable	4 Sep	Carleton	Bessie Gale	Robert Goodman	Drama	Feature	1 of 5 reels	Bluebird	
Black Friday	18 Sep	Carleton	Elionor Rossitor	Charles Dalton	Drama	Feature	lost	Red Feather	
The Human Gamble	8 Oct	Carleton	Flavia Hill	Charles Hill	Drama	Short	lost	Universal	
Barriers of Society	10 Oct	Carleton	Martha Gorham	Westie Phillips	Drama	Feature	1 of 5 reels	Red Feather	
The Devil's Bondwoman	11 Nov	Carleton	Beverly Hope	Mason Van Horton	Drama	Feature	lost	Red Feather	

After completing this film, Carleton would direct two more films for Universal, then sever his connections.

==== Themes ====
The central theme of Barriers of Society is the role of fate in the lives of the characters. A movie advertisement in the October 12, 1916 issue of The Seattle Star sums it up this way:

The story is a thrilling one of a romance of two souls brought together by fate on a desert island, two people from entirely different strata of society, who fall in love, their mutual attraction overcoming all the barriers that society puts in their way. The match that destiny has ordained is at last fulfilled.

A movie tagline unrelated to fate was "A man's millions against a woman's will".

==== Screenplay ====
This film was based on a Clarke Irvine play. The movie was adapted for the screen by Frederick Myton (1885–1955). Myton was 30 years old when the movie was released. He would also create the screenplay for the next and last film in the Davenport-Johnson series of films - The Devil's Bondwoman.

=== Filming ===
==== Exteriors ====
The story highlights Harry Arnold's yacht and his manipulative tactics to win Martha's affection. In order to film boat scenes, Lloyd Carleton and his team decided to rent a large steam vessel. The intended trip was to sail 400 nautical miles from Los Angeles to San Francisco. On the ship, they would shoot all the scenes designated in their script to happen on "Arnold's yacht." During the trip, the company could pause in Santa Barbara and its surrounding area to capture island scenes as specified in the movie. The party left Los Angeles in high spirits, with Dorothy Davenport, Emory Johnson, Richard Morris, and other cast members. Their initial jubilation quickly turned into a more somber mood.

After leaving port, the movie company faced strong winds and rough seas on what would become a three-day voyage. With waves crashing all around the boat's constant rocking made it impractical to shoot scenes. Besides everything else, a number of the actors suffered from seasickness. Filming began in earnest after the crew bounced back and the weather calmed down.

==== Interiors ====
On March 15, 1915, Laemmle opened the world's largest motion picture production facility, Universal City Studios. Any interior shots, not capture on location, would be performed in the studio complex at Universal City.

==== Schedule ====
Published new items indicate this movie was filmed between August and September 1916. This movie was officially released on October 16, 1916.

Date	News Item
Aug 13, 1916	Director Lloyd Carleton of Universal has commenced the production of a five-reel feature, being made under then working title of "The Road of Destiny."
Sep 09, 1916	An item published in the September 9, 1916 issue of the Motion Picture News stated – "... are back from a trip to San Francisco, where they made exteriors for the five-reel subject, The Road of Destiny."
Sep 23, 1916	According to an article in Motography, this movie was completed before September 23, 1916.

==== Working title ====
During this film's development, the working title was listed as The Road of Destiny. On September 29, 1916, this film was officially copyrighted as Barriers of Society.

=== Post production ===
The March 3, 1917 issue of The Moving Picture Weekly features an article about a rising actress named Roberta Wilson. The article highlights, "She has done a great many important things, such as starring in Red Feathers, like "Barriers of Society" and "The Heritage of Hate. The claim made in the article about her starring role in Barriers of Society was incorrect.

As stated in this article, Barriers of Society was a five-reel Universal Red Feather production featuring Dorothy Davenport and Emory Johnson. Filming for the production took place from August to September 1916, with an official release on October 16, 1916.

Heritage of Hate was initially planned as a three-reel movie, but was later released as a five-reel Universal Red Feather production starring Roberta Wilson and William Quinn. The film's official release date was November 13, 1916. Filming for "Heritage of Hate" began in July 1916 and was "nearing completion" in August 1916.

Since the films were recorded around the same time in difference locations, it was impossible for her to have had a lead role in both.

== Release and reception ==
=== Official release ===
The copyright was filed with U.S. Copyright Office on September 29, 1916. and entered in the record as shown: (Note: The copyright was filed with U.S. Copyright Office and entered into the record as shown. BARRIERS OF SOCIETY, Red Feather: 1916. 5 reels; Credits:Director, Lloyd B. Carleton; Story, Clarke Irvine; scenario, Fred Myton © Universal Film Mfg. Co., Inc.; 29Sep16; LP9216)

The release date of Monday, October 16, 1916, was cited in several movie magazines. Yet, the film is advertised in various newspapers on Friday, October 6 (Chicago Tribune) and Saturday, October 7 (Brooklyn, New York)

Red Feather Photo Plays were always released on Mondays in 1916. These earlier showings were simply pre-release screenings to large venues.

=== Advertising ===
Advertising plays a vital role in ensuring a movie's success by bringing paying customers to the theater. By providing details about plotlines, actors, release dates, and other key information, a successful marketing campaign boosts excitement among potential stakeholders. This knowledge empowered theater owners to make smarter booking decisions in a competitive market. In addition to an advertising campaign for a movie, Carl Laemmle added another wrinkle to assist potential stakeholders in deciding to view or book a new film.

In 1916, Universal became the first Hollywood studio to classify feature films based on production cost. One of the reasons behind this move was that the Big Five film studios owned their own movie houses, enabling them to have guaranteed outlets for their entertainment products. Unlike the majors, Universal did not own any theaters or theater chains. Branding all Universal-produced feature films would give theater owners another tool to judge the films they were about to lease and help fans decide which movies they wanted to see. (Note: Universal formed a three-tier branding system for their feature films based on the size of their budget and status. In the book "The Universal Story," the author Clive Hirschhorn describes the feature movie branding as: Red Feather Photoplays – low-budget feature films; Bluebird Photoplays – mainstream feature release and more ambitious productions; Jewel – prestige motion pictures featuring high budgets using prominent actors; In 1917, the Butterfly line, a grade between Red Feather and Bluebird, was introduced. During the following two years, half of Universal's feature film output was in the Red Feather and Butterfly categories. However, this was during a time when stars increasingly took the spotlight in advertising. The branding tags seemly ignored that the ticket-buying audience attended movies to see their favorite stars, not the vehicle allowing them to perform.)

In 1916, Universal produced 91 branded feature films, consisting of 44 Bluebirds and 47 Red Feather productions. The branding system had a brief existence and, by 1920, had faded away.

=== Reviews ===
The critics generally liked this film.

==== Critical response ====
In the October 14, 1916 issue of The Moving Picture World, movie critic Robert C. McElravy points out:

This five-reel offering owes much of its interest to two factors of universal interest in the plot conception, rather than to any special strength of presentation. There is a pleasing allegorical touch to all of the opening scenes, and the observer's interest is well maintained. The film has some weaknesses in construction but tells an entertaining story. It has no high dramatic moments but carries the interest quite well without them.

In the October 21, 1916 issue of The Moving Picture World, the staff review:

The story is simple in plot and quite appealing. Some construction is a little choppy, but it has a good adventurous flavor and retains the interest despite some weaknesses.

==== Audience response ====
Lincoln, Nebraska population 18,498

I want to thank you for the feature you sent me, "The Barriers of Society," and must say it is one of the best pictures I have had in a long time. The first day I ran it was Monday, and during the exciting scenes of the picture, I thought my patrons would tear the house down. The consequences were they all passed out of the theatre with a big smile of satisfaction on their faces, and last night (Tuesday), I had the biggest Tuesday night's business in the history of the house.
Nathan Dix
The Lily theatre

== Preservation status ==
Many silent-era films did not survive and are considered lost films. (Note: Film is history. With every foot of film lost, we lose a link to our culture, the world around us, each other, and ourselves. – Martin Scorsese, filmmaker, director NFPF Board A report by Library of Congress film historian and archivist David Pierce estimates that: around 75% of original silent-era films have perished; 14% of the 10,919 silent films released by major studios exist in their original 35 mm or other formats; 11% survive only in full-length foreign versions or film formats of lesser image quality.) In 1978, an extraordinary discovery was made in Dawson City located in Canada's Yukon Territory. The city of Dawson used a large stockpile of silent films to bolster a sagging hockey rink in 1929. The permafrost preserved the films. The film cache was discovered in 1978. The discovery would yield 533 reels of nitrate film containing numerous lost movies. The story was chronicled in the movie - Dawson City: Frozen Time. Among the preserved films in the Dawson Film Find was the 5-reel bluebird production of The Unattainable, released in September 1916. The permafrost also preserved this film. In both cases, only one reel was recoverable from each of the 5 reel feature films. The salvaged reels were donated to the Library of Congress.

This film's publicly available copyright document exists at the Library of Congress.

== Gallery ==
The Players and stills from the movie
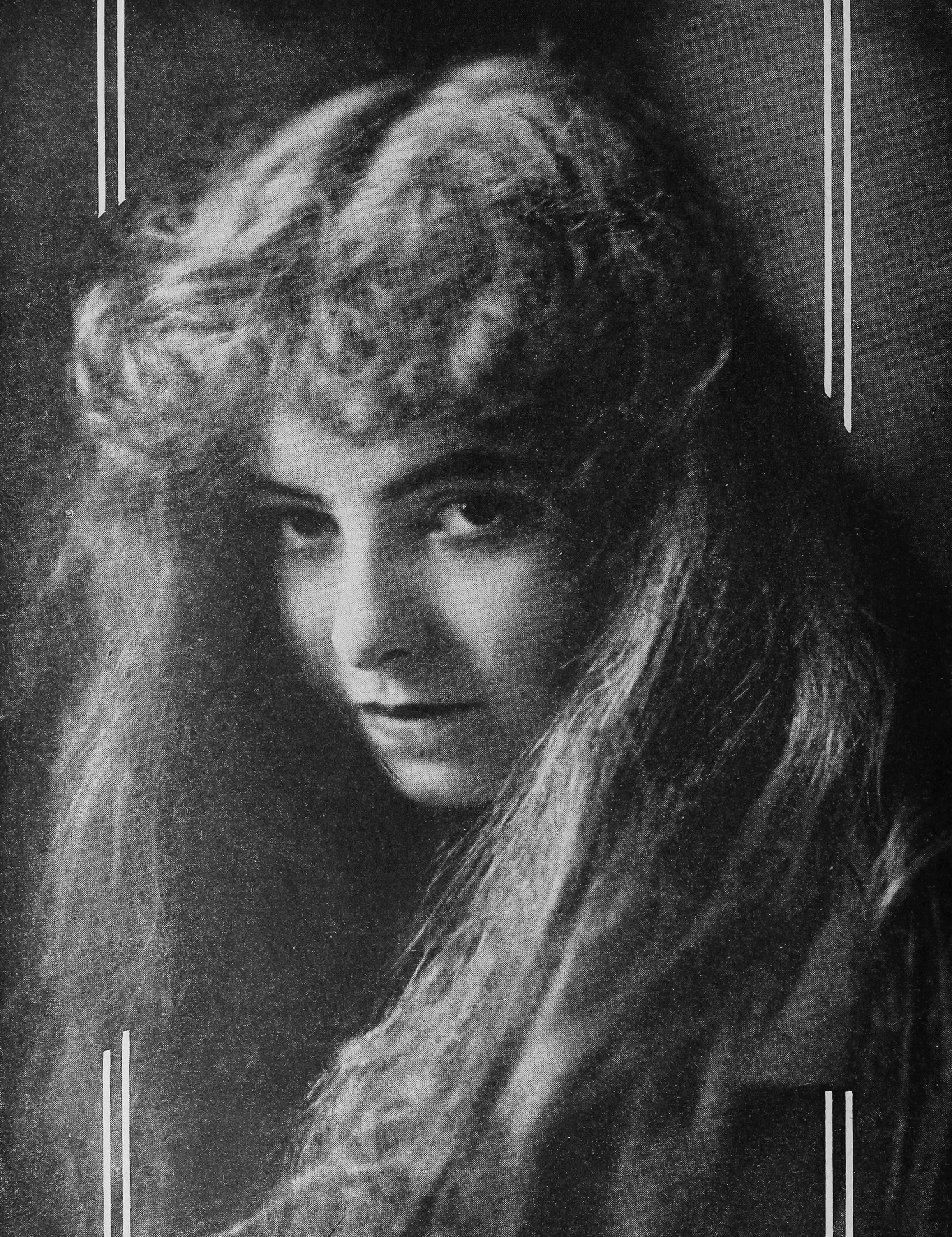
Dorothy Davenport
1914

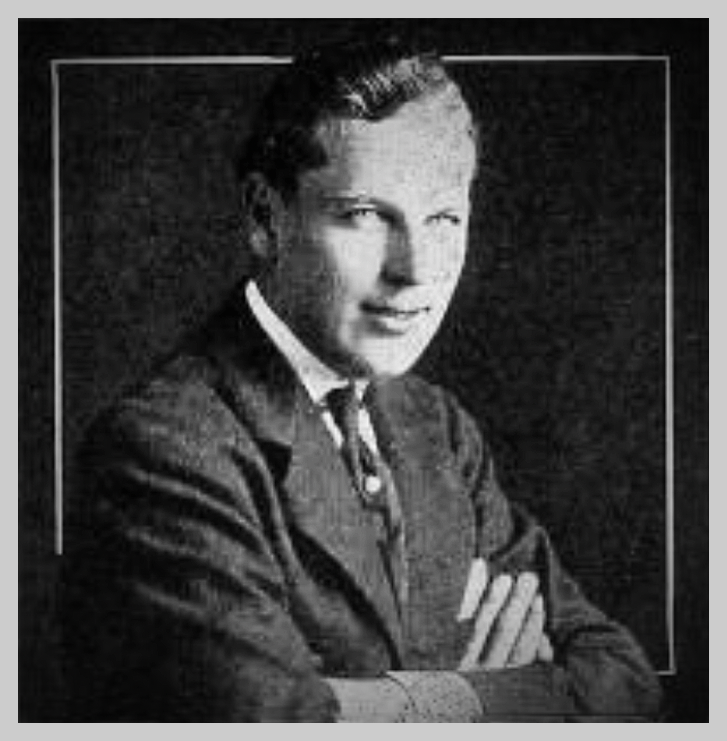
Emory Johnson
1916

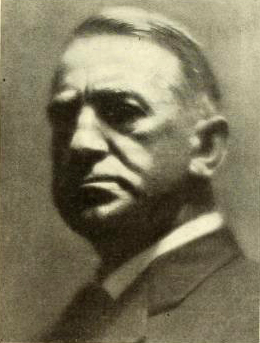
Alfred Allen
1919

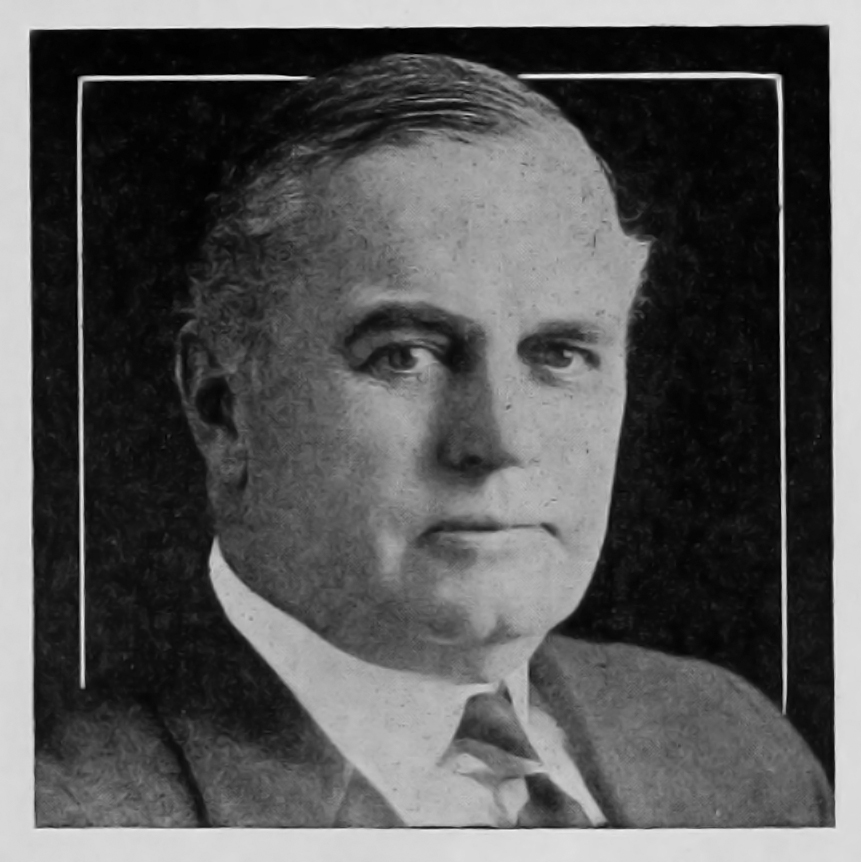
Richard Morris
1916

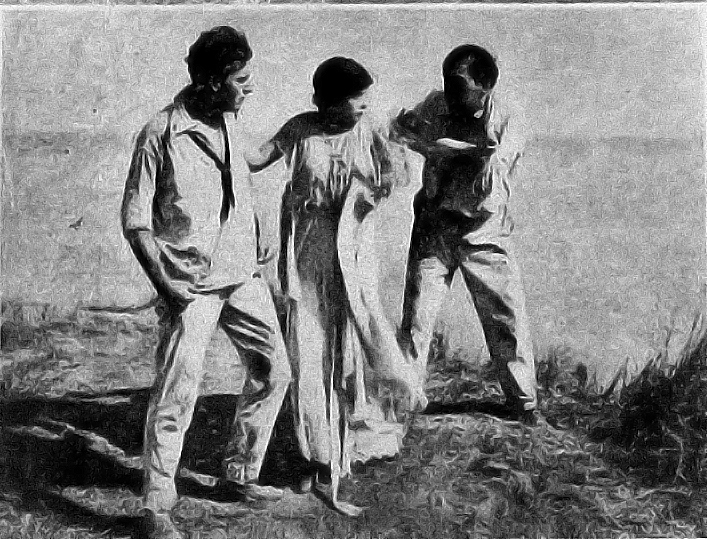
Westie, Martha and Arnold

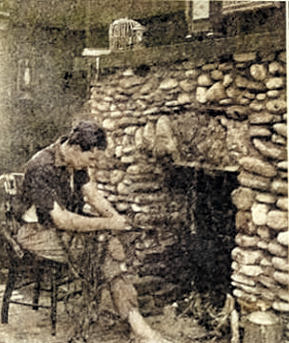
Westie starts fire in cabin

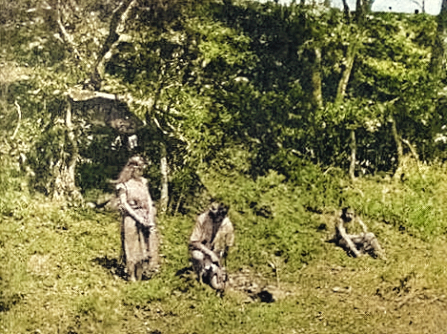
Martha, Westie, Arnold

== Sources ==
- Braff, R.E. (1999). The Universal Silents: A Filmography of the Universal Motion Picture Manufacturing Company, 1912-1929. McFarland. ISBN 978-0-7864-0287-8.
- Fleming, E.J. (2010). Wallace Reid: The Life and Death of a Hollywood Idol. McFarland. ISBN 978-0-7864-8266-5.
- Hirschhorn, Clive (1983). The Universal Story - The Complete History of the Studio and its 2,641 films. New York: Crown Publishing Group. pp. 22–23. ISBN 0-517-55001-6.
- Katchmer, G.A. (2015). A Biographical Dictionary of Silent Film Western Actors and Actresses. McFarland, Incorporated, Publishers. ISBN 978-1-4766-0905-8.
- Keil, C.; Stamp, S. (2004). American Cinema's Transitional Era: Audiences, Institutions, Practices. ACLS Humanities E-Book. University of California Press. ISBN 978-0-520-24027-8.
