= The Unattainable =

1916 drama film directed by Lloyd B. Carleton

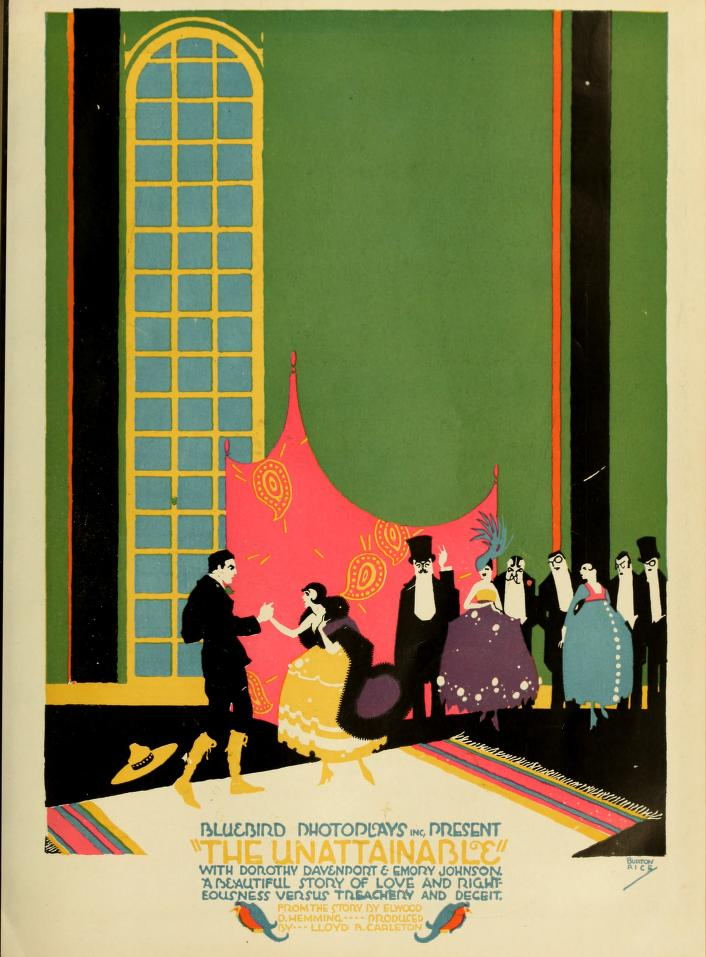
- Moving Picture Weekly Ad
- Directed by: Lloyd B. Carleton
- Screenplay by: Eugene B. Lewis
- Story by: Elwood D. Henning
- Produced by: Universal Bluebird Photoplays
- Starring: Emory Johnson; Dorothy Davenport
- Cinematography: Roy H. Klaffki
- Production company: Universal
- Distributed by: Universal
- Release date: September 4, 1916
- Running time: 50–75 minutes (5 reels)
- Country: United States
- Language: English intertitles

The Unattainable is a 1916 American black and white silent drama directed by Lloyd B. Carleton. The film is based on the story by Elwood D. Henning. The photoplay stars Dorothy Davenport and Emory Johnson.

The film opens by introducing us to Bessie Gale, a regular on the New York nightclub scene. In her circle, she's known as "the unattainable". A wealthy gentleman starts to pursue her. She finds relief from his romantic pursuits by joining a traveling theatrical company. The troupe heads out West. After Bessie misses a train connection, she meets a sheep rancher, and they get married. Then, her husband makes a major discovery which leads to a new series of adventures.

The film was released on September 4, 1916, by Universal

== Plot ==
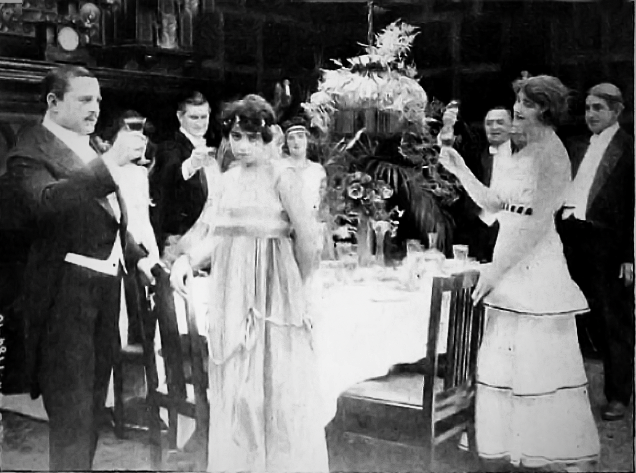
NYC nightlife

Bessie Gale is a well-known chorus girl in the New York cabaret and theater scene. Her friends lovingly nicknamed her "The Unattainable." Through the years, she has acquired the reputation for being unapproachable to potential suitors. Henry Morton is a wealthy individual (Note: Movie magazines also refer to Henry Morton: A movie review published in the September 16, 1916 issue of the Moving Picture World refers to Henry Morton as a "rich idler".; Another review in the September 2, 1916 issue of the Moving Picture World refers to Henry Morton as a "wealthy clubman".) who also frequents the club scene. Morton, upon meeting Bessie, begins his pursuit to win her heart.

Seeking relief from the club scene and her wealthy pursuer, Bessie joins a traveling theatrical troupe. She boards the train with the rest of the performers and heads west. The train carrying the performers stops at a way station in the Sierra Nevada mountains. The stunning scenery surrounding the train amazes Bessie. She gets off the train to enjoy the view. As she takes in the breathtaking landscapes, she wanders too far and misses the departing train.

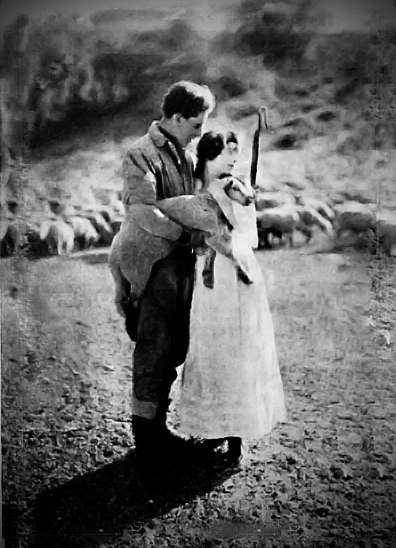
Robert and Bessie

Bessie asks the locals for assistance in finding shelter for the night. She attracts the attention of Robert Goodman and his mother. They recognize her situation and offer her a place to stay for the night. Eagerly, she accepts, and they head to the Goodman's sheep ranch. She informs the Goodmans that she intends to catch tomorrow's train and join her theater group. The following day, they returned to the way station. The train arrives on time, bearing a message from the manager of the stock company. According to the message, Bessie has lost her job because she failed to board the train with her coworkers yesterday. The Goodman offers comfort, assuring her that she can stay on the ranch for as long as she wants until she figures out her next moves. While staying on the ranch, Bessie makes a strong impression on Robert's mother, and Robert falls in love. Over time, Robert proposes to Bassie, and she accepts. They get married and start a peaceful life on the Goodman's sheep ranch. Bessie embraces a new life as a sheepherder's wife, leaving her past behind.

The Goodman family faces a crisis as their sheep begin to die unexpectedly. Robert traces the cause of death to the sheep eating a poisonous weed. Through hard work, Robert successfully creates a cure for the infected sheep. Unexpectedly, his recent remedy has a lucrative market. A New York company is willing to purchase the formula for a significant amount. After the agreements are finalized, the drug company asks Robert to travel to New York to sign papers and receive his royalty check. In order to avoid leaving his sheep unattended, Robert asks his mother to go instead. As she's getting ready to leave for New York, she slips and injures herself. In a last-minute decision, Robert asks if Bessie can go to New York in place of his mother. Bessie agrees to make the trip and heads to New York. After arriving, she signs the paperwork and collects the royalty check. Prior to leaving New York, she feels an inexplicable pull to revisit her old haunts.

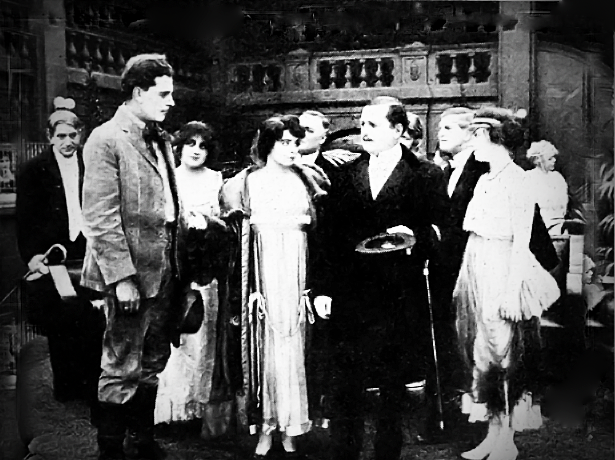
Robert confronts Henry

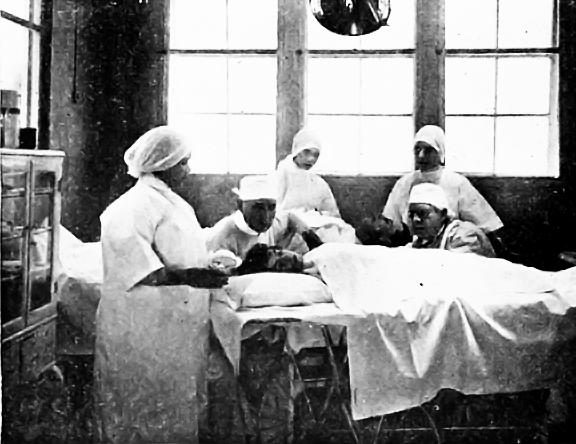
Transfusion room

The allure of her former glamorous life as a chorus girl pulls her back. She starts to return to her old way of life. Her previous theater manager offers her a job. Henry Morton resurfaces after getting wind of Bessie's comeback on the circuit and continues his quest for the Unattainable. Through their exchange of letters, Robert learns that Bessie has made a return to the stage and is now performing in New York. He makes a sudden decision to travel to New York without informing anyone. Without delay, he begins searching for his wife. Robert catches Bessie and Henry on a romantic dinner date. Filled with rage and anger, Goodman brutally assaults Morton. As the two men fight, Morton pulls out a gun and shoots Robert. Bleeding heavily, Goodman is rushed to the hospital in an ambulance.

Emotionally, Morton is overwhelmed by the guilt of his actions towards Goodman. Morton hurries to the hospital and offers to give blood in order to save Goodman's life. Unfortunately, Morton has the wrong blood type. Bessie becomes consumed by emotion as she watches her husband's life fade away. She takes a blood test, and the results match. Bessie is prepared for the procedure, and the transfusion starts. Robert gradually begins to regain his health. Once Robert's strength returns, he sees Bessie lying beside him on the table. Rising to his feet, he quickly heads over to her. They share a warm and loving embrace. After they have regained their health, they go back to the Goodman's sheep farm in Peace Valley. They live happily ever after.

== Cast ==
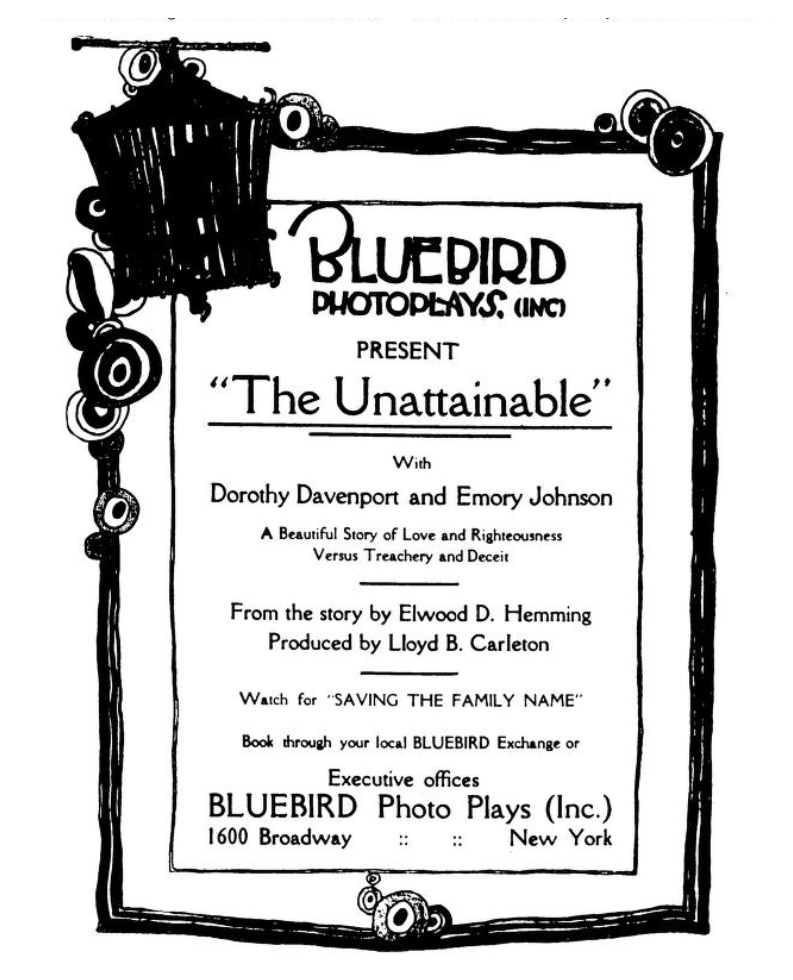
Actor	Role
Dorothy Davenport	Bessie Gale
Emory Johnson	Robert Goodman
Mattie Witting	Mrs. Goodman
Richard Morris	Henry Morton
Alfred Allen	Theatre Manager

== Production ==
=== Pre-production ===
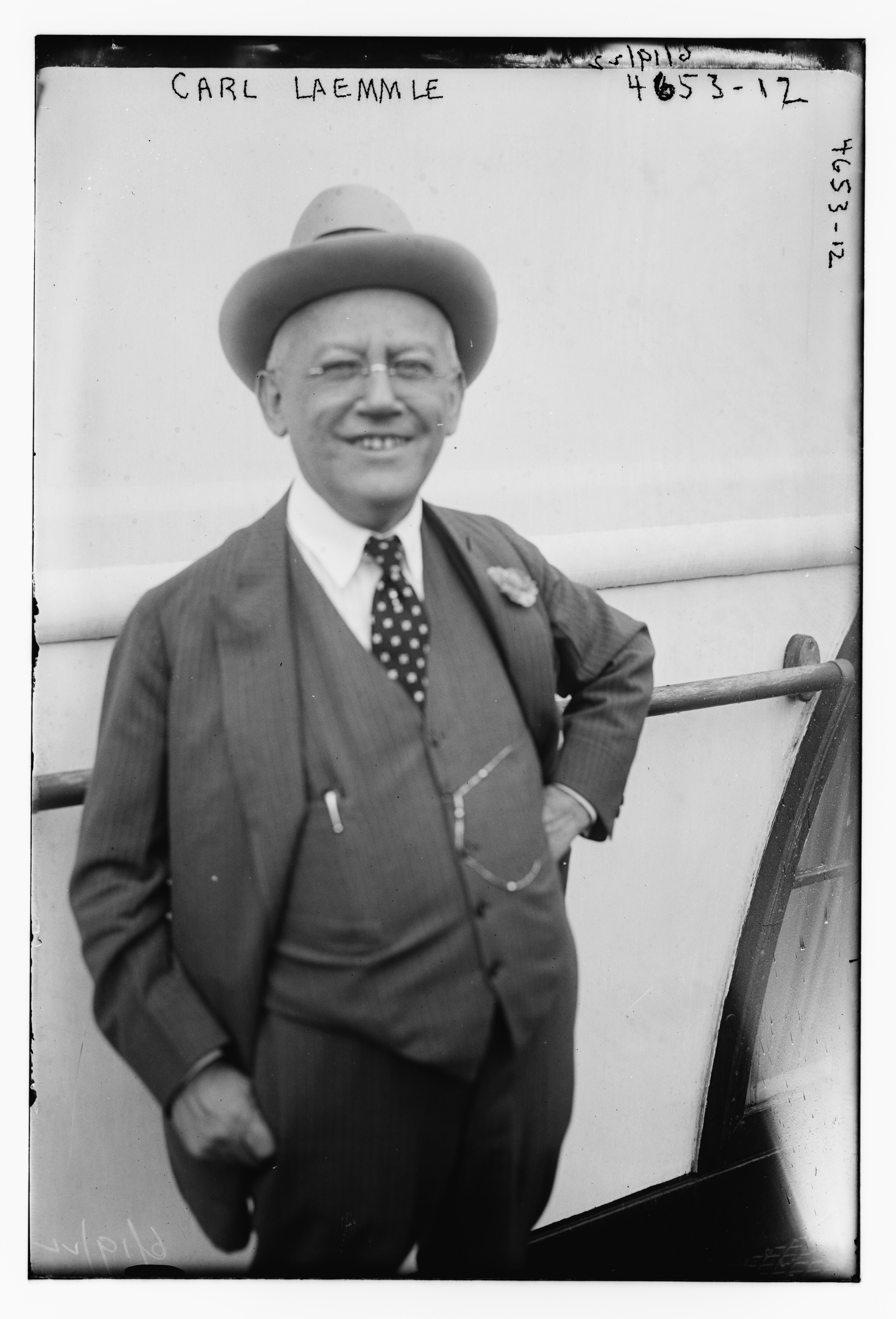
Carl Laemmle in 1918

Universal Logo 1915

In the book, "American Cinema's Transitional Era," the authors point out, The years between 1908 and 1917 witnessed what may have been the most significant transformation in American film history. During this "transitional era", widespread changes affected film form and film genres, filmmaking practices and industry structure, exhibition sites, and audience demographics. One aspect of this transition was the longer duration of films. Feature films (Note: A "feature film" or "feature-length film" is a narrative film (motion picture or "movie") with a running time long enough to be considered the principal or sole presentation in a commercial entertainment program. A film can be distributed as a feature film if it equals or exceeds a specified minimum running time and satisfies other defined criteria. The minimum time depends on the governing agency. The American Film Institute and the British Film Institute require films to have a minimum running time of forty minutes or longer. Other film agencies, e.g.,Screen Actors Guild, require a film's running time to be 60 minutes or greater. Currently, most feature films are between 70 and 210 minutes long.) were slowly becoming the standard fare for Hollywood producers. Before 1913, you could count the yearly features on two hands. Between 1915 and 1916, the number of feature movies rose 2 1/2 times or from 342 films to 835. There was a recurring claim that Carl Laemmle was the longest-running studio chief resisting the production of feature films. Universal was not ready to downsize its short film business because short films were cheaper, faster, and more profitable to produce than feature films. (Note: " Short Film" - There are no defined parameters for a Short film except for one immutable rule -the film's maximum running time. The Academy of Motion Picture Arts and Sciences defines a short film as "an original motion picture that has a running time of 40 minutes or less, including all credits".)

Laemmle would continue to buck this trend while slowly increasing his output of features. In 1914, Laemmle published an essay titled - Doom of long Features Predicted. In 1916, Laemmle ran an advertisement extolling Bluebird films while adding the following vocabulary on the top of the ad. (Note: The moving picture business is here to stay. That you must admit, despite carping critics and blundering sore-heads, true, some exhibitors have found business so good lately — but if you get down to facts when you look for a reason why, it's a 100 to 1 shot that they are, and for some time have been, dallying with a feature program. Some of these wise ones will tell you that business has picked up since they went into features, — BUT — ask them whether they are talking NET or GROSS. They will find they have an immediate appointment and terminate your queries unceremoniously. Funny how we like to kid ourselves, isn't it? The man who is packing 'em in and losing money on features is envied by his competitor, who is laying by a bit every day, and has a good steady, dependable patronage but admits to a few vacant seats at some performances. When this chap wakes up, he will realize that he has a gold mine and that good advertising will make it produce to capacity. The moral is that if you can tie up to the Universal Program, DO IT. If you can't NOW, watch your first chance. Let the people know what you have, and let the feature man go on to ruin if he wants to. You should worry! Motion Picture News - May 6, 1916) Carl Laemmle released 91 feature-length films in 1916, as stated in Clive Hirschhorn's book, The Universal Story.

==== Casting ====
- Dorothy Davenport (1895–1977) was an established star for Universal when the 21 year-old actress played Bessie Gale. This feature would be Davenport's introduction to the Bluebird program. She had acted in hundreds of movies by the time she starred in this film. The majority of these films were 2-reel shorts, as was the norm in Hollywood's teen years. She had been making movies since 1910. She started dating Wally Reid when she was barely 16, and he was 20. They married in 1913. After her husband died in 1923, she used the name "Mrs. Wallace Reid" in the credits for any project she took part in. Besides being an actress, she would eventually become a film director, producer, and writer.
- Emory Johnson (1894–1960) was 22 years old when he acted in this movie as Robert Goodman. This feature would be Johnson's introduction to the Bluebird program. In January 1916, Emory signed a contract with Universal Film Manufacturing Company. Carl Laemmle of Universal Film Manufacturing Company thought he saw great potential in Johnson, so he chooses him to be Universal's new leading man. Laemmle's hope was Johnson would become another Wallace Reed. A major part of his plan was to create a movie couple that would sizzle on the silver screen. Laemmle thought Dorothy Davenport and Emory Johnson could create the chemistry he sought. Johnson and Davenport would complete 13 films together. They started with the successful feature production of Doctor Neighbor in May 1916 and ended with The Devil's Bondwoman in November 1916. After completing the last movie, Laemmle thought Johnson did not have the screen presence he wanted. He decided not to renew his contract. Johnson would make 17 movies in 1916, including 6 shorts and 11 feature-length Dramas. 1916 would become the second-highest movie output of his entire acting career. Emory acted in 25 films for Universal, mostly dramas with a sprinkling of comedies and westerns.
- Richard Morris (1862–1924) was a 54 year-old actor when he played Henry Morton. He was a character actor and former opera singer known for Granny (1913). He would eventually participate in many Johnson projects, including |In the Name of the Law (1922), The Third Alarm (1922), The West~Bound Limited (1923), The Mailman (1923) until his untimely death in 1924.
- Alfred Allen (1866–1947) was 50 years old when he was selected to play Theatre Manager. Allen was highly educated, had a commanding presence and stood six feet tall, and weighed two hundred pounds. He got his start in the film industry at Universal city in 1913. He landed his first role in 1915. His roles were character parts, and he played mostly fathers, villains, or ranch owners. Alfred Allen appeared in 69 features from 1916 through 1929. After Heartaches he would appear in four more Davenport-Johnson projects: A Yoke of Gold, The Unattainable, The Human Gamble, and Barriers of Society.

==== Director ====
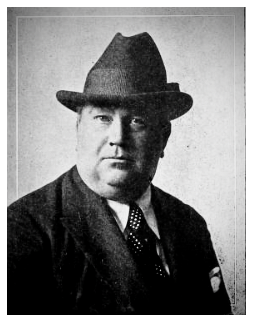
Director Lloyd B. Carleton

Lloyd B. Carleton (c. 1872–1933) started working for Carl Laemmle in the Fall of 1915. Carleton arrived with impeccable credentials, having directed some 60 films for the likes of Thanhouser, Lubin, Fox, and Selig.

Between March and December 1916, 44-year-old Lloyd Carleton directed 16 movies for Universal, starting with The Yaqui and ending with The Morals of Hilda released on December 11, 1916. Emory Johnson acted in all 16 of these films. Of Carleton's total 1916 output, 11 were feature films, and the rest were two-reel shorts. After Emory Johnson signed his Universal contract in early 1916, Carl Laemmle, the owner of Universal Pictures, thought he had found a new leading man. Laemmle was looking for a male lead like Wallace Reid. He also wanted to develop a cinematic pair that would captivate audiences.

Johnson became Laemmle's choice for his new leading man. Laemmle chose Dorothy Davenport to spark screen chemistry with Johnson. She was a Universal contract player who was Wallace Reid's wife. Universal's top director, Lloyd B. Carleton, was tasked by Laemmle to direct all of this pair's films.

The collaboration of Johnson and Davenport resulted in 13 films, beginning with the release of Doctor Neighbor in May 1916. The last film in the series was The Devil's Bondwoman, released in November 1916. The majority of the movies were feature films. All the films featured Johnson and Davenport as the main stars.

Davenport became pregnant in October 1916, and her film output dropped sharply in early 1917. In the end, Laemmle felt Johnson was not talented nor charismatic enough. He would not be Universal's version of Wally Reid. Laemmle felt that the films needed more screen chemistry, even if they made money. In June 1918, Universal failed to renew the contract of Emory Johnson.

The table below lists the 13 films Johnson and Davenport collaborated on.

◆ Films starring Emory Johnson and Dorothy Davenport in 1916 ◆
Title	Released	Director	Davenport role	Johnson role	Type	Time	LOC	Brand	Notes
Doctor Neighbor	1 May	Carleton	Hazel Rogers	Hamilton Powers	Drama	Feature	lost	Red Feather	
Her Husband's Faith	11 May	Carleton	Mabel Otto	Richard Otto	Drama	Short	lost	Universal	
Heartaches	18 May	Carleton	Virginia Payne	S Jackson Hunt	Drama	Short	lost	Universal	
Two Mothers	1 Jun	Carleton	Violetta Andree	2nd Husband	Drama	Short	lost	Universal	
Her Soul's Song	15 Jun	Carleton	Mary Salsbury	Paul Chandos	Drama	Short	lost	Universal	
The Way of the World	3 Jul	Carleton	Beatrice Farley	Walter Croyden	Drama	Feature	lost	Red Feather	
No. 16 Martin Street	13 Jul	Carleton	Cleo	Jacques Fournier	Drama	Short	lost	Universal	
A Yoke of Gold	14 Aug	Carleton	Carmen	Jose Garcia	Drama	Feature	lost	Red Feather	
The Unattainable	4 Sep	Carleton	Bessie Gale	Robert Goodman	Drama	Feature	1 of 5 reels	Bluebird	
Black Friday	18 Sep	Carleton	Elionor Rossitor	Charles Dalton	Drama	Feature	lost	Red Feather	
The Human Gamble	8 Oct	Carleton	Flavia Hill	Charles Hill	Drama	Short	lost	Universal	
Barriers of Society	10 Oct	Carleton	Martha Gorham	Westie Phillips	Drama	Feature	1 of 5 reels	Red Feather	
The Devil's Bondwoman	11 Nov	Carleton	Beverly Hope	Mason Van Horton	Drama	Feature	lost	Red Feather	

==== Screenplay ====
Eugene B. Lewis (1878–1924) wrote the screen adaptation for this film based on a story by Elwood D. Henning.

=== Filming ===
==== Exteriors ====
To capture the rustic atmosphere called for in the film, director Lloyd Carleton's company paid a visit to a big sheep ranch located near Los Angeles, California. The ranch was located in the northwestern San Fernando Valley region of Los Angeles. The surrounding area provided one of several ideal backgrounds for the film. Hence, broad segments of the film's exteriors were shot in Chatsworth Park, California. Another area ideally suited for background footage was the Sierra Nevada Mountains located in the state of Nevada.

The beginning scenes of the film stand out because they showcase over 3,000 sheep filmed at Chatsworth Park ranch in California.

The blood transfusion procedure in the hospital scene is portrayed realistically and follows the correct protocols. Universal City's state-of-the-art hospital was the location for shooting the transfusion scenes.

==== Interiors ====
On March 15, 1915, Laemmle opened the world's largest motion picture production facility, Universal City Studios. The interiors were filmed in the studio complex at Universal City, California.

==== Working title ====
During the production of films, a project must have a way to be referenced. The project is given a working title. An Alternate title is another term for a Working Title. Frequently, the working title turns into the release title.

During this film's development, the working title was listed as - The Miracle of Love.

=== Post production ===
The theatrical release of this film totaled five reels or 5,000 feet of film. As is often the case, the listed time for this feature-length movie varies. The average time per 1,000-foot 35mm reel varied between ten and fifteen minutes per reel at the time. Thus, the total time for this movie is computed between fifty and seventy-five minutes.

== Release and reception ==
=== Official release ===
The copyright was filed with U.S. Copyright Office on August 10, 1916. and entered in the record as shown: (Note: The copyright was filed with U.S. Copyright Office and entered in the record as shown. THE UNATTAINABLE. 1916 5 reels. Credits:Director, Lloyd B. Carleton; story, Elwood D. Hemming; scenario, Eugene B. Lewis © Bluebird Photoplays, Inc., 10Aug16; LP8898)

The official film release date to US theaters was September 4, 1916.

=== Advertising ===
In 1916, Universal became the first Hollywood studio to classify feature films based on production cost. One of the reasons behind this move was that the "Big Five" film studios owned their own movie houses, enabling them to have guaranteed outlets for their entertainment products. Unlike the majors, Universal did not own any theaters or theater chains. Branding all Universal-produced feature films would give theater owners another tool to judge the films they were about to lease and help fans decide which movies they wanted to see. (Note: Universal formed a three-tier branding system for their feature films based on the size of their budget and status. In the book "The Universal Story," the author Clive Hirschhorn describes the feature movie branding as: Red Feather Photoplays – low-budget feature films; Bluebird Photoplays – mainstream feature release and more ambitious productions; Jewel – prestige motion pictures featuring high budgets using prominent actors; In 1917, the Butterfly line, a grade between Red Feather and Bluebird, was introduced. During the following two years, half of Universal's feature film output was in the Red Feather and Butterfly categories. However, this was during a time when stars increasingly took the spotlight in advertising. The branding tags seemly ignored that the ticket-buying audience attended movies to see their favorite stars, not the vehicle allowing them to perform.)

In 1916, Universal produced 91 branded feature films, consisting of 44 Bluebirds and 47 Red Feather productions. This film carried the designation of Universal's "Bluebird" brand. The branding system had a brief existence and, by 1920, had faded away.

==== Burton Rice posters ====
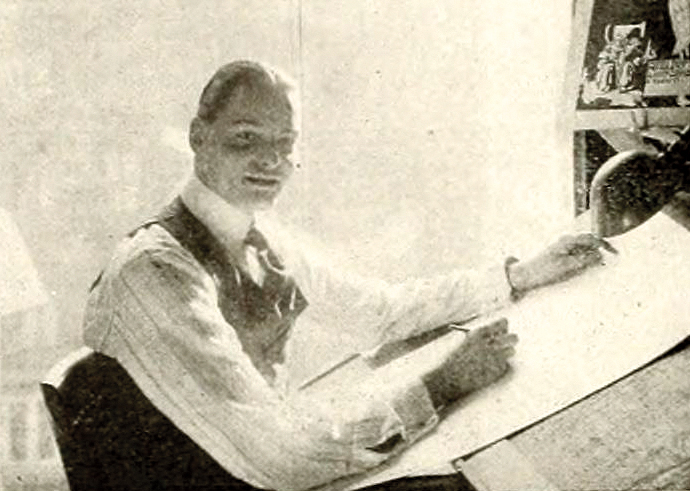
Burton Rice at work 1916

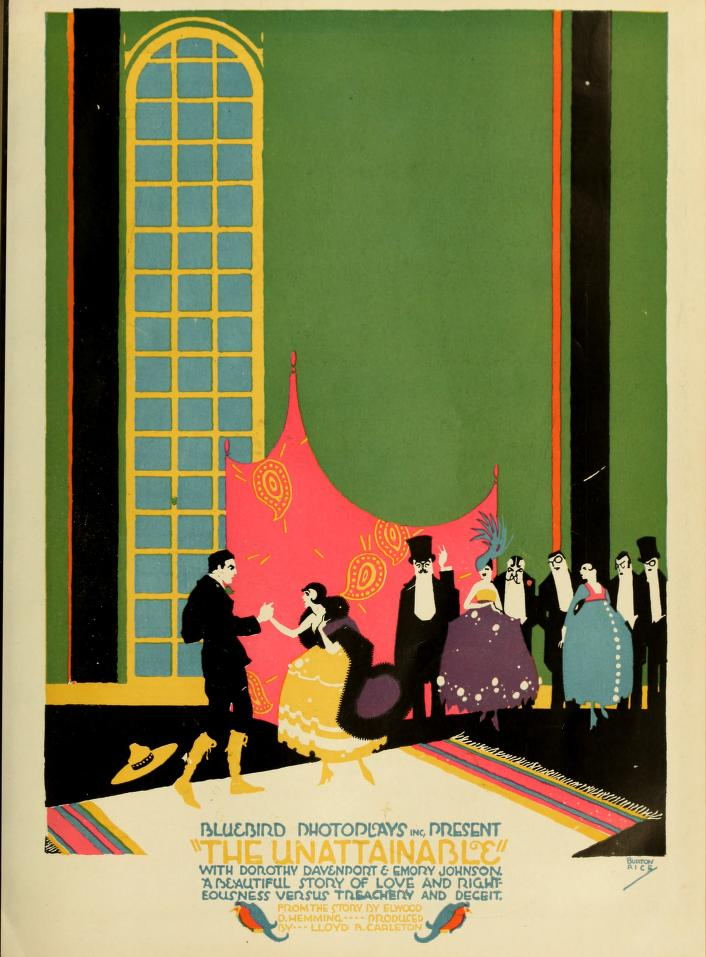
Rice poster for this movie

Movie posters are a specific form of poster art that advertises a certain film. Advertising movies in magazines can be an effective way to appeal to a viewership and theater owners. The Bluebird Photoplay ads signaled the start of a new period of creativity in the movie ad industry. Chicago graphic artist Burton Rice became part of the Universal advertising department. He was 21 years of age.

Chicago lost one of its cleverest younger artists when the advertising department of the Universal home office induced Burton Rice to take up his residence in New York and be one of its staff. Mr. Rice's work in modern art has been among the notable achievements of Chicago's commercial art circles. His poster designs especially have been the cause of much favorable comment. Although always a creative department and the home of much unique ad copy, the Universal advertising department is now turning out its best work—and it is of the kind which compels attention. In Mr. Rice, Nat G. Rothstein and Ray Cavanaugh find a most capable co-worker. — Motography - February 19, 1916, Burton Rice Now Universal Artist,

Most of Universal's 1916 bluebird advertisements featured Rice's abstract poster art and his inserts gathered worldwide attention. His brief tenure ended in December 1916, when he set sail for Europe to become an Ambulance driver in World War I. Media related to Category:Art works by Burton Rice at Wikimedia Commons

=== Reviews ===
The critics generally panned this film.

In the September 2, 1916 issue of The Moving Picture World, movie critic Margaret McDonald observed:

It is difficult to believe that Bluebird Photoplays Inc. would place on their program a picture as crude in construction and amateurish in action as "The Unattainable". ... It is technically and dramatically speaking unusually poor.

In the September 2, 1916 issue of the Motion Picture News, movie critic Harvey Thew discerns:

Although this picture is well and carefully produced, with a wealth of beautiful locations and photography, there is nothing to mark it as anything out of the usual in the way of photoplay offerings. There are a number of important points which do not ring true.

== Preservation status ==
Many silent-era films did not survive (lost films). (Note: Film is history. With every foot of film lost, we lose a link to our culture, the world around us, each other, and ourselves. – Martin Scorsese, filmmaker, director NFPF Board A report by Library of Congress film historian and archivist David Pierce estimates that: around 75% of original silent-era films have perished; 14% of the 10,919 silent films released by major studios exist in their original 35 mm or other formats; 11% survive only in full-length foreign versions or film formats of lesser image quality.) In 1978, an extraordinary discovery was made in Dawson City located in Yukon's Canadian territory. The city unknowingly had used a large cache of silent films to bolster a sagging hockey rink in 1929. The permafrost preserved them. The 1978 discovery yielded 533 reels of nitrate film containing numerous lost movies. The discovery was chronicled in the movie - Dawson City: Frozen Time.

Among the Dawson Film Find were the 5-reel bluebird production of The Unattainable, released in September 1916, and Barriers of Society released on October 16, 1916. In both cases, only one reel was recoverable from each of the 5 reel feature films. The films were turned over to the Library of Congress. The website of the Library of Congress displays the following: (Note: Holdings: U.S. Archive Completeness: fragment Archive: National Archives Of Canada (Ottawa) [Cao], Library of Congress (Washington). Note: 35 mm Nitrate Positive: Usw 35 mm Acetate Dupe Negative: Usw Complete: Usw: Incomplete (Reel 1 Of 5). Record No.: 40065 Note: Dawson City)

== Gallery ==
The Players

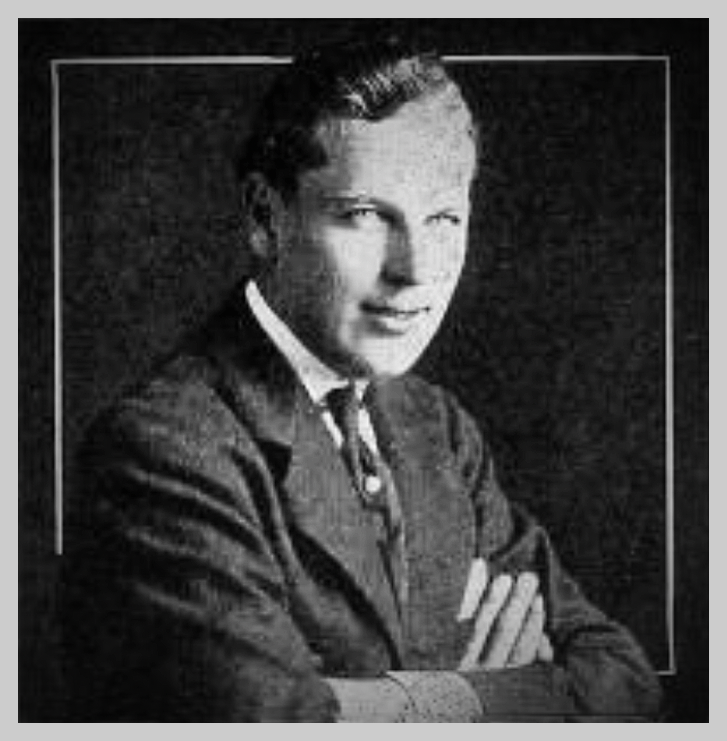
Johnson 1916
Robert Goodman

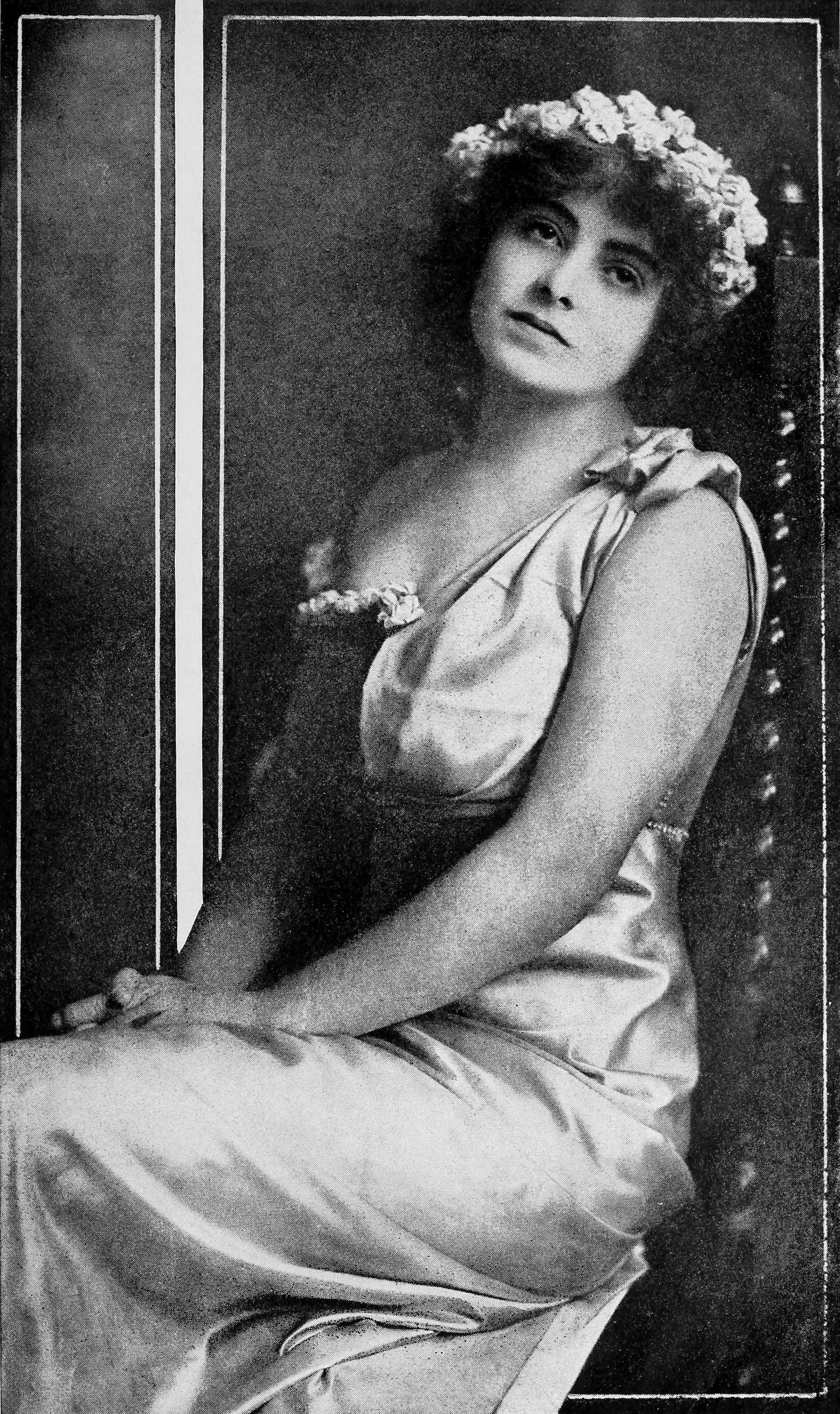
Davenport 1916
Bessie Gale

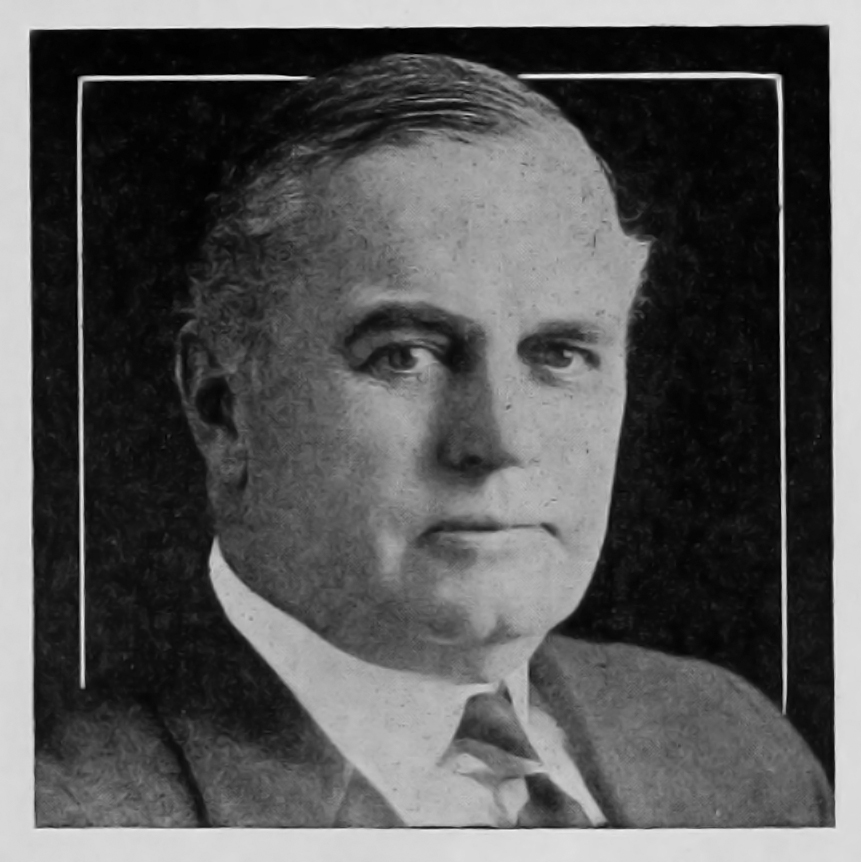
Morris 1916
Henry Morton

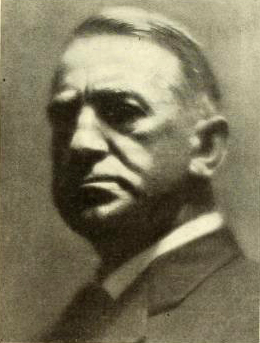
Allen 1919
Theatre Manager

== Sources ==
- Braff, R.E. (1999). The Universal Silents: A Filmography of the Universal Motion Picture Manufacturing Company, 1912-1929. McFarland. ISBN 978-0-7864-0287-8.
- Codori, J. (2020). Film History Through Trade Journal Art, 1916-1920. McFarland, Incorporated, Publishers. ISBN 978-1-4766-3829-4.
- Fleming, E.J. (2010). Wallace Reid: The Life and Death of a Hollywood Idol. McFarland. ISBN 978-0-7864-8266-5.
- Hirschhorn, Clive (1983). The Universal Story - The Complete History of the Studio and its 2,641 films. New York: Crown Publishing Group. pp. 22–23. ISBN 0-517-55001-6.
- Katchmer, G.A. (2015). A Biographical Dictionary of Silent Film Western Actors and Actresses. McFarland, Incorporated, Publishers. ISBN 978-1-4766-0905-8.
- Kawin, Bruce F. (1987). How Movies Work. University of California Press. ISBN 9780520076969.
- Keil, C.; Stamp, S. (2004). American Cinema's Transitional Era: Audiences, Institutions, Practices. ACLS Humanities E-Book. University of California Press. ISBN 978-0-520-24027-8.
- Moving Picture World and View Photographer. World Photographic Publishing Company. 1916.
