= Hot Curves =

1930 film

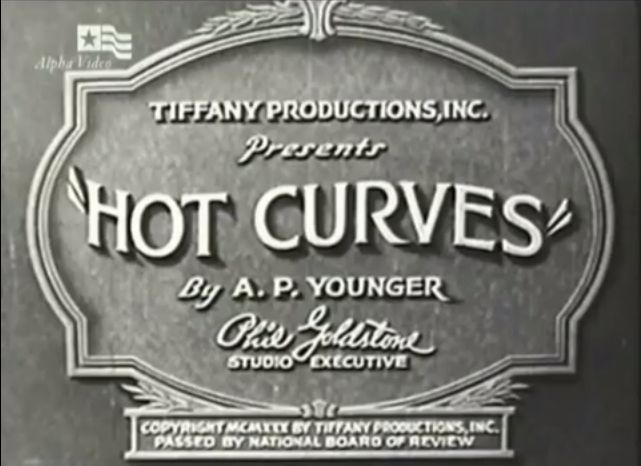
- Directed by: Norman Taurog
- Written by: Frank Mortimer (story); Benny Rubin (story); Earle Snell (scenario); A. P. Younger (story)
- Produced by: Tiffany Pictures
- Starring: Rex Lease; Alice Day; Benny Rubin
- Cinematography: Max Dupont
- Edited by: Clarence Kolster
- Distributed by: Tiffany Pictures
- Release date: June 15, 1930
- Running time: 83 minutes
- Country: United States
- Language: English

Hot Curves is a 1930 American pre-Code comedy-drama film produced and distributed by Tiffany Pictures and directed by Norman Taurog. A print is held by the Library of Congress.

Rex Lease, Benny Rubin and Alice Day star. The supporting cast features Pert Kelton.

== Plot ==
Jim Dolan, with a little help from his grandmother, shows the Pittsburgh baseball team what a good pitcher he can be. Jim also becomes involved in romance with Elaine, the manager's daughter, while Maizie, a gold digger, schemes to come between them.

Ballpark vendor Benny, by coincidence, becomes the team's catcher while his quirky sweetheart, Cookie, cheers him on. Jim becomes arrogant, alienates teammates and is even suspended, but snaps out of it in time to save the big game of the World Series.

== Cast ==
- Benny Rubin - Benny Goldberg
- Rex Lease - Jim Dolan
- Alice Day - Elaine McGrew
- Pert Kelton - Cookie
- John Ince - Mr McGrew, Baseball Team Manager, Elaine's father
- Mary Carr - "Grandma Dolan"
- Mike Donlin - Baseball Team Scout
- Natalie Moorhead - Maizie
- Paul Hurst - "Slug" (a baseball player)
- Henry Hall - Baseball Team Owner
- Marceline Day - Girl
- Robert Livingston - a baseball player (billed as Robert Randall)
- Greta Granstedt - Girl

== See also ==
- List of baseball films
