= Julius Sizzer =

1931 film

- Directed by: Edward Ludwig
- Written by: Edward Ludwig; Benny Rubin
- Starring: See below
- Distributed by: RKO Radio Pictures
- Release date: September 7, 1931
- Running time: 18 minutes
- Country: United States
- Language: English

Julius Sizzer (1931) is an American two-reel short film directed by Edward Ludwig. According to film critic Nelson Bell, it was an "obvious travesty" of the serious gangster film Little Caesar released by Warner Bros. earlier that year.

== Plot summary ==
In this short, (Benny Rubin) plays a dual role of a man and his brother who have to dodge gangsters trying to put them on the spot.

== Cast ==
- Benny Rubin
- Gwen Lee
- Lena Malena
- Matthew Betz
- Maurice Black
- G. Pat Collins
- Tom McGuire
- Clifford Dempsey
