= Guests Wanted =

1932 film

- Directed by: Ralph Ceder
- Written by: Ewart Adamson
- Produced by: Lew Lipton (supervising producer)
- Cinematography: Harry Jackson
- Edited by: Russell Schoingarin
- Distributed by: RKO Radio Pictures
- Release date: January 18, 1932
- Running time: 18 minutes
- Country: United States
- Language: English

Guests Wanted is a 1932 American Pre-Code short subject directed by Ralph Ceder.

== Cast ==
- Benny Rubin as Benny
- Nell Breen as Nell
- Louise Carver as Mrs. Carver
- Charles Dorety as Second Miner
- Billy Franey as First Miner
- Bud Jamison as Jimmy
