= Benny Rubin =

American actor and comedian (1899–1986)

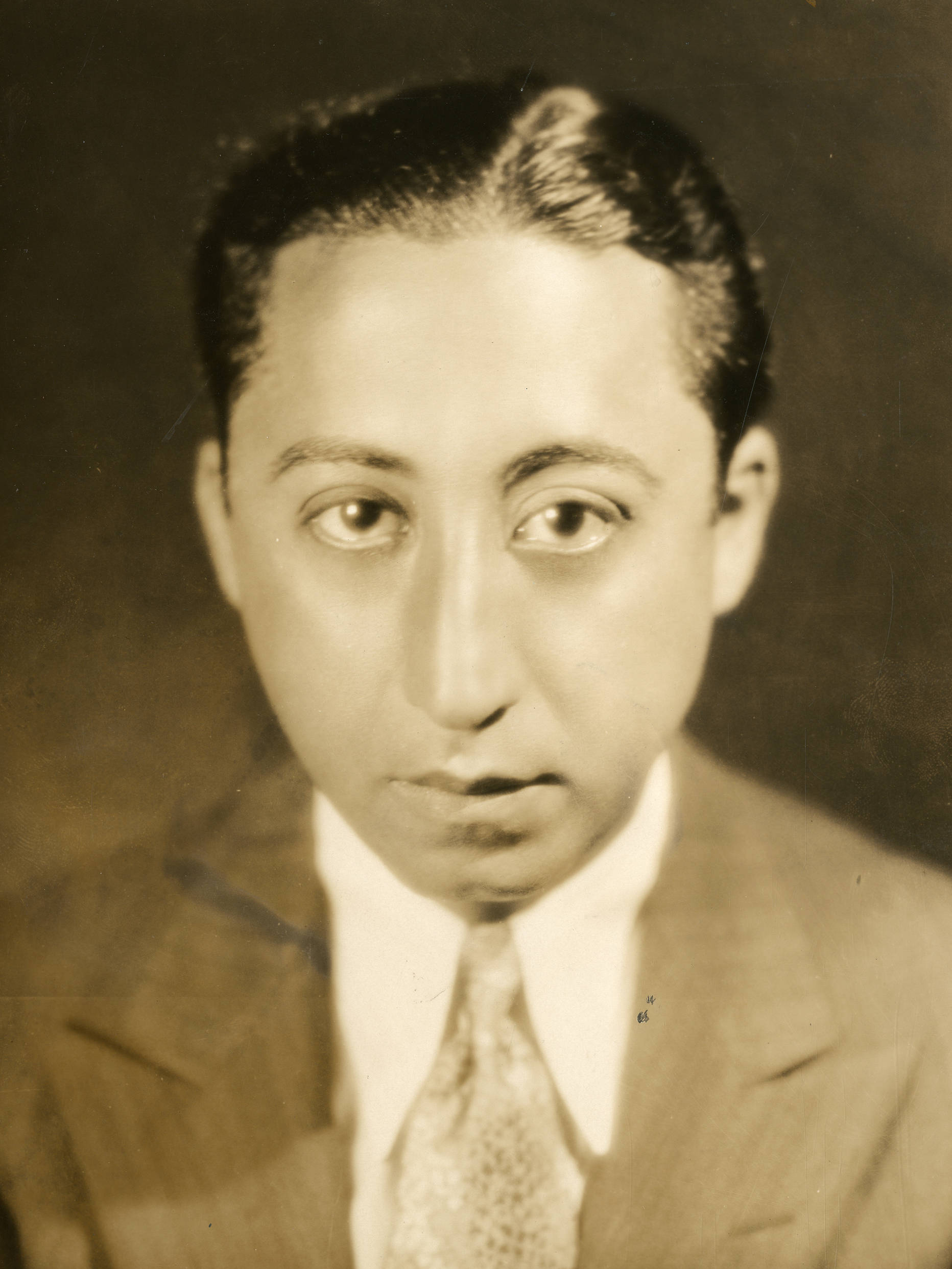
- Rubin in 1930
- Born: Benjamin Rubin; February 2, 1899; Boston, Massachusetts, U.S.
- Died: July 15, 1986 (aged 87); Los Angeles, California, U.S.
- Resting place: Hillside Memorial Park Cemetery
- Occupations: Actor, comedian
- Years active: 1928–1981
- Spouse: Mary Bolt (1927–1934)

Benny Rubin (February 2, 1899 – July 15, 1986) was an American comedian and film actor.

Born Benjamin Rubin in Boston, Rubin made more than 200 radio, film, and television appearances over a span of 50 years. He is best known to today's audiences as a comic foil for Jack Benny on radio and television, and as a featured player in six Three Stooges comedies of the 1950s.

== Career ==
In 1929, Rubin went to Hollywood, where he began working as a supporting actor in films and began developing his ethnic characters. His film debut was in Naughty Baby.

Rubin was known for his ability to imitate many dialects. He performed in vaudeville with routines that included "English That's Different".

He was featured in both full-length films and short comedies in the 1930s, and although Tiffany Pictures mounted two star vehicles for him, they failed to advance his career. Hot Curves and Sunny Skies (both 1930) are his only starring features.

== Radio ==
Rubin demonstrated his dialect talents as a panelist on the joke-telling radio series, Stop Me If You've Heard This One.

On radio, he played Professor Kropotkin (succeeding Hans Conried) on My Friend Irma, was a co-host of Only Yesterday, and was a member of the cast of The Bickersons.

He made frequent guest appearances on both the radio and television versions of The Jack Benny Program. A popular bit included Jack asking a series of questions that Rubin would answer with an increasingly irritated, "I don't know!" followed by the punchline.

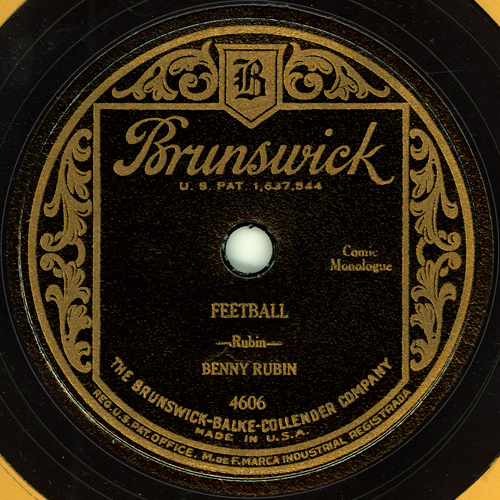
Phonograph record of "Feetball" monologue on Brunswick Records (Brunswick-Balke-Collender Company)

According to Jack Benny's autobiography, Sunday Nights at Seven, he once cast Rubin to portray a Pullman porter. Although Rubin could do a convincing African-American dialect, the producer insisted he looked "too Jewish" for the part. As a result, Benny ended up giving the part to Eddie Anderson, and the porter character soon evolved into the famous "Rochester Van Jones".

Rubin also played character roles in dramatic programs on CBS Radio in the mid-1950s.

== Television ==
Dialect specialist Rubin provided the voice for Joe Jitsu throughout the television cartoon series, The Dick Tracy Show. He appeared in a 1961 episode of The Tab Hunter Show. In 1963, he played the second Indian chief on a Thanksgiving episode of The Beverly Hillbillies. He also appeared in an episode of The Joey Bishop Show as hypnotist Max Collins. He had a memorable turn in the Gunsmoke episode "Dr. Herman Schultz, M.D.", in which he played a physician who used his mesmeric skills to steal money.

In 1968, he appeared on Petticoat Junction as Gus Huffle, owner of the Pixley movie theater, in the episode "Wings". (The episode title is in direct reference to the 1927 silent movie Wings starring Charles "Buddy" Rogers and Richard Arlen, who also appear in the episode as themselves.) Then in 1969, he appeared again (credited as the "man patient") in the episode: "The Ballard of the Everyday Housewife". He appeared in an episode of The Munsters.

== With the Three Stooges ==
Benny Rubin appeared in six short subjects starring the Three Stooges between 1953 and 1957. Like the Stooges, he was a former vaudevillian, but he had reservations about the trio's abilities: "None of them were very clever. They were journeyman comics, in the sense that they were told how to act something out, in much the same way that one teaches a little boy how to dance."

In later years, he made many bit appearances in movies, sometimes uncredited, as in a number of Jerry Lewis features.

== Books ==
Jokes by Lew Lehr, Cal Tinney, Roger Bower, and Rubin were collected in Stop Me If You've Heard This One (1949), a Permabook published by Garden City Publishing. Permabooks were designed with an unusual format of a paperback bound with stiff cardboard covers (with a "special wear-resistant finish") to simulate the look and feel of a hardcover book, and the company had previously published Best Jokes for All Occasions, edited by Powers Moulton.

The Stop Me If You've Heard This One Permabook featured a two-page foreword by Tinney, a one-page introduction by Bower, 66 pages of jokes by Bower, 85 pages of jokes by Tinney, and 82 pages of jokes by Lehr. Under the heading, "P.S.", Rubin only had space for four jokes on two pages, as explained, "Benny Rubin was added to our show just before press time."

In 1972, Rubin published his autobiography, Come Backstage with Me.

== Personal life ==
On March 26, 1927, Rubin married actress Mary O'Brien. They had a daughter and were divorced in 1934.

== Death ==
Benny Rubin died of a heart attack at Cedars-Sinai Medical Center in Los Angeles on July 15, 1986. He is interred in Hillside Memorial Park Cemetery in Culver City.

== Selected filmography ==
- Naughty Baby (1928) - Benny Cohen
- Marianne (1929)
- Sunny Skies (1930)
- Crazy House (1930)
- Hot Curves (1930)
- Love in the Rough (1930)
- Leathernecking (1930)
- The March of Time (1930, unreleased) - Himself
- Julius Sizzer (1931, short)
- Dumb Dicks (1932, short)
- Guests Wanted (1932, short)
- The Girl Friend (1935)
- Sunday Night at the Trocadero (1937, short)
- The Headleys at Home (1938)
- Fighting Mad (1939)
- Zis Boom Bah (1941)
- Here Comes Mr. Jordan (1941)
- Double Trouble (1941)
- Obliging Young Lady (1942)
- Tangier Incident (1953)
- Up in Smoke (1957)
- A Hole in the Head (1959)
- The Errand Boy (1961)
- Pocketful of Miracles (1961)
- Science Friction (1963)
- A House Is Not a Home (1964)
- That Funny Feeling (1965)
- Angel in My Pocket (1969)
- Hook, Line & Sinker (1969)
- How to Frame a Figg (1971)
- The Return of the World's Greatest Detective (1976)
- The Shaggy D.A. (1976)
- Coma (1978)
- The Other Side of the Wind (posthumously released in 2018; scenes filmed in 1974–75)
