= Harry Jackson (cinematographer) =

American cinematographer

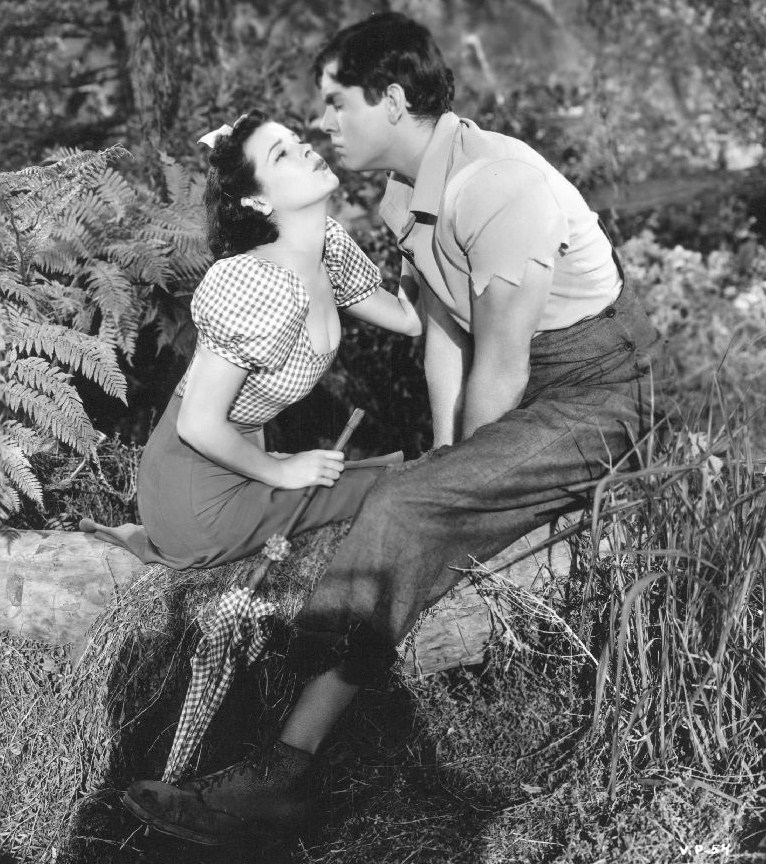
Billie Seward-Jeff York in Li'l Abner

Harry Jackson (April 15, 1896 – August 3, 1953) was an American cinematographer.

Jackson was born in Nebraska, and was first employed in Hollywood as a still photographer for Warner Brothers. As a cinematographer he was active through the end of the silent era in 1927, until his death in 1953, shooting about 75 films altogether. He was nominated for the Academy Award for Color Cinematography for his work on 1947's Mother Wore Tights.

== Selected filmography ==
- The Sporting Chance (1925)
- The Man in Hobbles (1928)
- George Washington Cohen (1928)
- The Floating College (1928)
- Ladies of the Night Club (1928)
- The Gun Runner (1928)
- Lucky Boy (1929)
- Broadway Scandals (1929)
- Guests Wanted (1932)
- Get That Girl (1932)
- Jungle Bride (1933)
- Forbidden Melody (1933)
- She Learned About Sailors (1934)
- $10 Raise (1935)
- In Paris, A.W.O.L. (1936)
- In His Steps (1936)
- Think Fast, Mr. Moto (1937)
- Circumstantial Evidence (1945)
- Wake Up and Dream (1946)
- Strange Triangle (1946)
- Mother Wore Tights (1947)
- When My Baby Smiles at Me (1948)
- Dancing in the Dark (1949)
- The Beautiful Blonde from Bashful Bend (1949)
- A Ticket to Tomahawk (1950)
- Anne of the Indies (1951)
- Pony Soldier (1952)
- The Kid from Left Field (1953)
