= Billy Franey =

American actor (1889–1940)

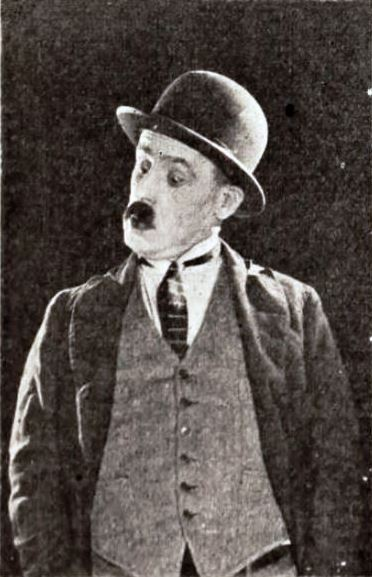
- Franey in 1922
- Born: William Gerald Franey; June 23, 1889; Chicago, Illinois, U.S.
- Died: December 6, 1940 (aged 51); Hollywood, California, U.S.
- Occupation: Actor
- Years active: 1914–1940

William Gerald Franey (June 23, 1889 – December 6, 1940) was an American film actor.

== Biography ==
Born in Chicago in 1889, Franey appeared in more than 400 films between 1914 and 1941, mostly playing comedic roles. He was an actor of disheveled appearance and fuzzy mustache, usually in a suit a couple of sizes too big. His late career included numerous uncredited appearances in classics like Bringing Up Baby, and he also appeared as the father-in-law of Edgar Kennedy in several of his series of short comedies.

Franey contracted influenza and died from complications involving the illness in 1940.

Gale Henry, Vivien Oakland, Milburn Morante, Edgar Kennedy, and Max Asher attended his funeral.

== Partial filmography ==
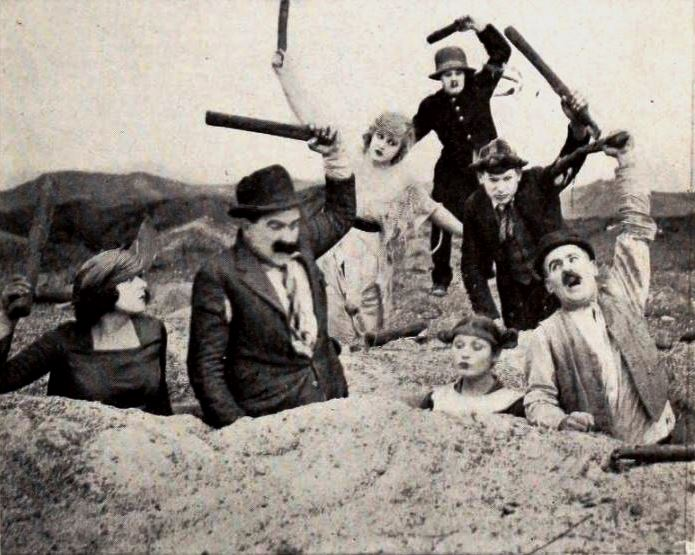
Franey at right in Her Naughty Wink (1920)

- The Leak (1917)
- Skirts (1921)
- Quincy Adams Sawyer (1922)
- A Western Demon (1922)
- The White Panther (1924)
- The Fire Patrol (1924)
- With Kit Carson Over the Great Divide (1925)
- Manhattan Madness (1925)
- S.O.S. Perils of the Sea (1925)
- The Fear Fighter (1925)
- The Great Sensation (1925)
- The False Alarm (1926)
- Moran of the Mounted (1926)
- Señor Daredevil (1926)
- King of the Saddle (1926)
- The Windjammer (1926)
- Code of the Northwest (1926)
- A Desperate Moment (1926)
- Danger Quest (1926)
- The Dead Line (1926)
- The Dangerous Dude (1926)
- The Golden Stallion (1927)
- Out All Night (1927)
- She's a Sheik (1927)
- The Racing Fool (1927)
- King of the Herd (1927)
- The Royal American (1927)
- The Lost Limited (1927)
- Under the Tonto Rim (1928)
- Five and Ten Cent Annie (1928)
- Romance of a Rogue (1928)
- The Glorious Trail (1928)
- Give and Take (1928)
- Cheyenne (1929)
- The Royal Rider (1929)
- Anne Against the World (1929)
- Dumb Dicks (1931) (short)
- Freighters of Destiny (1931)
- Forgotten Women (1931)
- The Sheriff's Secret (1931)
- Partners (1932)
- The Night of June 13 (1932) (uncredited)
- Guests Wanted (1932) (short)
- Ghost Valley (1932)
- War of the Range (1933)
- Somewhere in Sonora (1933)
- The Fiddlin' Buckaroo (1933)
- No More Women (1934)
- Western Racketeers (1934)
- The Star Packer (1934)
- Five Bad Men (1935)
- Dummy Ache (1936) (short)
- Bringing Up Baby (1938)
